= Young's inequality =

Young's inequality may refer to:

- Young's inequality for products, bounding the product of two quantities
- Young's convolution inequality, bounding the convolution product of two functions
- Young's inequality for integral operators

== See also ==
- William Henry Young, English mathematician (1863–1942)
- Hausdorff–Young inequality, bounding the coefficient of Fourier series
