= Young's inequality for integral operators =

Bound on the Lp -> Lq operator norm

In mathematical analysis, the Young's inequality for integral operators, is a bound on the $L^p\to L^q$ operator norm of an integral operator in terms of $L^r$ norms of the kernel itself.

== Statement ==
Assume that $X$ and $Y$ are measurable spaces, $K : X \times Y \to \mathbb{R}$ is measurable and $q,p,r\geq 1$ are such that $\frac{1}{q} = \frac{1}{p} + \frac{1}{r} -1$. If

$\int_{Y} |K (x, y)|^r \,\mathrm{d} y \le C^r$ for all $x\in X$

and

$\int_{X} |K (x, y)|^r \,\mathrm{d} x \le C^r$ for all $y\in Y$

then

$$\int_{X} \left|\int_{Y} K (x, y) f(y) \,\mathrm{d} y\right|^q \, \mathrm{d} x
\le C^q \left( \int_{Y} |f(y)|^p \,\mathrm{d} y\right)^\frac{q}{p}.$$

== Particular cases ==
=== Convolution kernel ===
If $X = Y = \mathbb{R}^d$ and $K (x, y) = h (x - y)$, then the inequality becomes Young's convolution inequality.

== See also ==
Young's inequality for products
