= Conjugate index =

In mathematics, two real numbers $p, q>1$ are called conjugate indices (or Hölder conjugates) if

$$\frac{1}{p} + \frac{1}{q} = 1.$$

Formally, we also define $q = \infty$ as conjugate to $p=1$ and vice versa.

Conjugate indices are used in Hölder's inequality, as well as Young's inequality for products; the latter can be used to prove the former. If $p, q>1$ are conjugate indices, the spaces L^{p} and L^{q} are dual to each other (see L^{p} space).

== Properties ==
The following are equivalent characterizations of Hölder conjugates:

- $\frac{1}{p} + \frac{1}{q} = 1,$
- $pq = p + q,$
- $\frac{p}{q} = p - 1,$
- $\frac{q}{p} = q - 1.$

== See also ==
- Beatty's theorem
