= Young's convolution inequality =

Mathematical inequality about the convolution of two functions

In mathematics, Young's convolution inequality is a mathematical inequality about the convolution of two functions, named after William Henry Young.

== Statement ==
=== Euclidean space ===
In real analysis, the following result is called Young's convolution inequality:

Suppose $f$ is in the Lebesgue space $L^p(\Reals^d)$ and $g$ is in $L^q(\Reals^d)$ and

$$\frac{1}{p} + \frac{1}{q} = \frac{1}{r} + 1$$

with $1 \leq p, q, r \leq \infty.$ Then

$$\|f * g\|_r \leq \|f\|_p \|g\|_q.$$

Here the star denotes convolution, $L^p$ is Lebesgue space, and

$$\|f\|_p = \Bigl(\int_{\Reals^d} |f(x)|^p\,dx \Bigr)^{1/p}$$

denotes the usual $L^p$ norm.

Equivalently, if $p, q, r \geq 1$ and $\frac{1}{p} + \frac{1}{q} + \frac{1}{r} = 2$ then

$$\left|\int_{\Reals^d} \int_{\Reals^d} f(x) g(x - y) h(y) \,\mathrm{d}x \,\mathrm{d}y\right|
\leq \left(\int_{\Reals^d} \vert f\vert^p\right)^\frac{1}{p} \left(\int_{\Reals^d} \vert g\vert^q\right)^\frac{1}{q} \left(\int_{\Reals^d} \vert h\vert^r\right)^\frac{1}{r}$$

=== Generalizations ===
Young's convolution inequality has a natural generalization in which we replace $\Reals^d$ by a $\sigma$-compact unimodular group $G.$ If we let $\mu$ be a bi-invariant Haar measure on $G$ and we let $f, g : G \to\Reals$ or $\Complex$ be integrable functions, then we define $f * g$ by

$$f*g(x) = \int_G f(y)g(y^{-1}x)\,\mathrm{d}\mu(y).$$

Then in this case, Young's inequality states that for $f\in L^p(G,\mu)$ and $g\in L^q(G,\mu)$ and $p, q, r \in [1,\infty]$ such that

$$\frac{1}{p} + \frac{1}{q} = \frac{1}{r} + 1$$

we have a bound

$$\lVert f*g \rVert_r \leq \lVert f \rVert_p \lVert g \rVert_q.$$

Equivalently, if $p, q, r \ge 1$ and $\frac{1}{p} + \frac{1}{q} + \frac{1}{r} = 2$ then

$$\left|\int_G \int_G f(x) g(y^{-1}x) h (y) \,\mathrm{d}\mu(x) \,\mathrm{d}\mu(y)\right|
\leq \left(\int_G \vert f\vert^p\right)^\frac{1}{p} \left(\int_G \vert g\vert^q\right)^\frac{1}{q} \left(\int_G \vert h\vert^r\right)^\frac{1}{r}.$$

Since $\Reals^d$ is in fact a locally compact abelian group (and therefore unimodular) with the Lebesgue measure the desired Haar measure, this is in fact a generalization.

This generalization may be refined. Let $G$ and $\mu$ be as before and assume $1 < p, q, r < \infty$ satisfy $\tfrac{1}{p} + \tfrac{1}{q} = \tfrac{1}{r} + 1.$ Then there exists a constant $C$ such that for any $f \in L^p(G,\mu)$ and any measurable function $g$ on $G$ that belongs to the weak $L^q$ space $L^{q,w}(G, \mu),$ which by definition means that the following supremum

$$\|g\|_{q,w}^q ~:=~ \sup_{t > 0} \, t^q \mu(|g| > t)$$

is finite, we have $f * g \in L^r(G, \mu)$ and

$$\|f * g\|_r ~\leq~ C \, \|f\|_p \, \|g\|_{q,w}.$$

== Applications ==
An example application is that Young's inequality can be used to show that the heat semigroup is a contracting semigroup using the $L^2$ norm (that is, the Weierstrass transform does not enlarge the $L^2$ norm).

== Proof ==
=== Proof by Hölder's inequality ===
By the triangle inequality for integrals, $|f \ast g| \leq |f| \ast |g|$, and so it suffices to consider the case where $f$ and $g$ are non-negative real-valued functions. If $r = \infty$, then $\tfrac{1}{p} + \tfrac{1}{q} = 1$, and so by Hölder's inequality we have
$$(f \ast g)(x) = \int_{\mathbb{R}^d} f(y) g(x-y)\,dy \leq \|f\|_p \|g\|_q$$
for any $x \in \mathbb{R}^d$, and so $\|f \ast g\|_\infty \leq \|f\|_p \|g\|_q$. If $r < \infty$, then take $p'$ and $q'$ to be the Hölder conjugate exponents of $p$ and $q$ respectively, and note that $\tfrac{1}{r} + \tfrac{1}{q'} = \tfrac{1}{p}$ and $\tfrac{1}{r} + \tfrac{1}{p'} = \tfrac{1}{q}$.

Thus we can decompose
$$f(y)g(x-y) = (f(y)^pg(x-y)^q)^{1/r} f(y)^{p/q'} g(x-y)^{q/p'}.$$
Then since $\tfrac{1}{r} + \tfrac{1}{q'} + \tfrac{1}{p'} = 1$, we can use the generalized Hölder inequality and the translation invariance of the Lebesgue measure to estimate
$$\begin{align}
(f \ast g)(x) &\leq \left(\int_{\mathbb{R}^d} f(y)^p g(x-y)^q\,dy\right)^{1/r} \left(\int_{\mathbb{R}^d} f(y)^p\,dy\right)^{1/q'} \left(\int_{\mathbb{R}^d} g(x-y)^q\,dy\right)^{1/p'}\\
&= \|f\|_p^{p/q'} \|g\|_q^{q/p'} \left(\int_{\mathbb{R}^d} f(y)^p g(x-y)^q\,dy\right)^{1/r}.
\end{align}$$
Thus by using Tonelli's theorem and translation invariance,
$$\begin{align}
\|f \ast g\|_r &\leq \|f\|_p^{p/q'} \|g\|_q^{q/p'} \left(\int_{\mathbb{R}^d} \int_{\mathbb{R}^d} f(y)^p g(x-y)^q\,dy\,dx\right)^{1/r}\\
&= \|f\|_p^{p/q'} \|g\|_q^{q/p'} \left(\int_{\mathbb{R}^d} f(y)^p \int_{\mathbb{R}^d} g(x-y)^q\,dx\,dy\right)^{1/r}\\
&= \|f\|_p^{p/q'} \|g\|_q^{q/p'} \|f\|_p^{p/r} \|g\|_q^{q/r}\\
&= \|f\|_p \|g\|_q.
\end{align}$$
The same proof works in the case when $\mathbb{R}^d$ is replaced with any $\sigma$-compact unimodular group $G$ along with its Haar measure $\mu$.

=== Proof by interpolation ===
Young's inequality can also be proved by interpolation; see the article on Riesz–Thorin interpolation for a proof.

== Sharp constant ==
In case $p, q > 1,$ Young's inequality can be strengthened to a sharp form, via

$$\|f*g\|_r \leq c_{p,q} \|f\|_p \|g\|_q.$$

where the constant $c_{p,q} < 1.$ When this optimal constant is achieved, the function $f$ and $g$ are multidimensional Gaussian functions.

== See also ==
- Minkowski inequality
