= Tonelli's theorem =

In mathematics, Tonelli's theorem may refer to

- Tonelli's theorem (measure theory), a successor of Fubini's theorem
- Tonelli's theorem (functional analysis), a fundamental result on the weak lower semicontinuity of nonlinear functionals on L^{p} spaces
