= Hölder's inequality =

Inequality between integrals in Lp spaces

In mathematical analysis, Hölder's inequality, named after German mathematician Otto Hölder, is a fundamental inequality between integrals and an indispensable tool for the study of L^{p} spaces.

Hölder's inequality—Let $(S,\Sigma,\mu)$ be a measure space and let $p,q\in [1,\infty]$ with 1/p + 1/q = 1. Then for all measurable real- or complex-valued functions f and g on S,

$$\|fg\|_1 \le \|f\|_p \|g\|_q.$$

If, in addition, $p,q\in(1,\infty)$ and $f\in L^p(\mu)$ and $g\in L^q(\mu)$, then Hölder's inequality becomes an equality if and only if $|f|^p$ and $|g|^q$ are linearly dependent in $L^1(\mu)$, meaning that there exist real numbers $\alpha,\beta\geq 0$, not both of them zero, such that $\alpha|f|^p=\beta|g|^q$ $\mu$-almost everywhere.

The numbers p and q above are said to be Hölder conjugates of each other. The special case $p=q=2$ gives a form of the Cauchy–Schwarz inequality. Hölder's inequality holds even if $\|fg\|_1$ is infinite, the right-hand side also being infinite in that case. Conversely, if f is in $L^p(\mu)$ and g is in $L^q(\mu)$, then the pointwise product $fg$ is in $L^1(\mu)$.

Hölder's inequality is used to prove the Minkowski inequality, which is the triangle inequality in the space $L^p(\mu)$, and also to establish that $L^q(\mu)$ is the dual space of $L^p(\mu)$ for $p\in[1,\infty)$.

Hölder's inequality (in a slightly different form) was first found by Leonard James Rogers (1888). Inspired by Rogers' work, Hölder (1889) gave another proof as part of a work developing the concept of convex and concave functions and introducing Jensen's inequality, which was in turn named for work of Johan Jensen building on Hölder's work.

== Remarks ==
=== Conventions ===
The brief statement of Hölder's inequality uses some conventions.

- In the definition of Hölder conjugates, 1/∞ means zero.
- If p, q ∈ [1, ∞), then ‖f ‖_{p} and ‖g‖_{q} stand for the (possibly infinite) expressions

$$\begin{align}
&\left(\int_S |f|^p\,\mathrm{d}\mu\right)^{\frac{1}{p}} \\
&\left(\int_S |g|^q\,\mathrm{d}\mu\right)^{\frac{1}{q}}
\end{align}$$

- If p = ∞, then ‖f ‖_{∞} stands for the essential supremum of |f |, similarly for ‖g‖_{∞}.
- The notation ‖f ‖_{p} with 1 ≤ p ≤ ∞ is a slight abuse, because in general it is only a norm of f if ‖f ‖_{p} is finite and f is considered as equivalence class of μ-almost everywhere equal functions. If f ∈ L^{p}(μ) and g ∈ L^{q}(μ), then the notation is adequate.
- On the right-hand side of Hölder's inequality, 0 × ∞ as well as ∞ × 0 means 0. Multiplying a > 0 with ∞ gives ∞.

=== Estimates for integrable products ===
As above, let f and g denote measurable real- or complex-valued functions defined on S. If ‖fg‖_{1} is finite, then the pointwise products of f with g and its complex conjugate function are μ-integrable, the estimate

$$\biggl|\int_S f\bar g\,\mathrm{d}\mu\biggr|\le\int_S|fg|\,\mathrm{d}\mu =\|fg\|_1$$

and the similar one for fg hold, and Hölder's inequality can be applied to the right-hand side. In particular, if f and g are in the Hilbert space L^{2}(μ), then Hölder's inequality for p = q = 2 implies

$$|\langle f,g\rangle| \le \|f\|_2 \|g\|_2,$$

where the angle brackets refer to the inner product of L^{2}(μ). This is also called Cauchy–Schwarz inequality, but requires for its statement that ‖f ‖_{2} and ‖g‖_{2} are finite to make sure that the inner product of f and g is well defined. We may recover the original inequality (for the case p = 2) by using the functions |f | and |g| in place of f and g.

=== Generalization for probability measures ===
If (S, Σ, μ) is a probability space, then p, q ∈ [1, ∞] just need to satisfy 1/p + 1/q ≤ 1, rather than being Hölder conjugates. A combination of Hölder's inequality and Jensen's inequality implies that

$$\|fg\|_1 \le \|f\|_p \|g\|_q$$

for all measurable real- or complex-valued functions f and g on S.

== Notable special cases ==
For the following cases assume that p and q are in the open interval (1,∞) with 1/p + 1/q = 1.

=== Counting measure ===
For the $n$-dimensional Euclidean space, when the set $S$ is $\{1,\dots,n\}$ with the counting measure, we have

$$\sum_{k=1}^n |x_k\,y_k| \le \left( \sum_{k=1}^n |x_k|^p \right)^{\frac{1}{p}} \left( \sum_{k=1}^n |y_k|^q \right)^{\frac{1}{q}}
\text{ for all }(x_1,\ldots,x_n),(y_1,\ldots,y_n)\in\mathbb{R}^n\text{ or }\mathbb{C}^n.$$

Often the following practical form of this is used, for any $(r,s)\in\mathbb{R}_+$:

$$\left(\sum_{k=1}^n |x_k|^r\,|y_k|^s \right)^{r+s}\le \left( \sum_{k=1}^n |x_k|^{r+s} \right)^{r} \left( \sum_{k=1}^n |y_k|^{r+s} \right)^{s}.$$

For more than two sums, the following generalisation (Lohwater (1982), Chen (2014)) holds, with real positive exponents $\lambda_i$ and $\lambda_a + \lambda_b+ \cdots +\lambda_z =1$:

$$\sum_{k=1}^n |a_k|^{\lambda_a}\,|b_k|^{\lambda_b} \cdots |z_k|^{\lambda_z} \le  \left(\sum_{k=1}^n |a_k|\right)^{\lambda_a} \left(\sum_{k=1}^n |b_k|\right)^{\lambda_b} \cdots \left(\sum_{k=1}^n |z_k|\right)^{\lambda_z} .$$

Equality holds iff $|a_1|: |a_2|: \cdots : |a_n| =|b_1|: |b_2|: \cdots : |b_n| = \cdots = |z_1|: |z_2|: \cdots : |z_n|$.

If $S=\N$ with the counting measure, then we get Hölder's inequality for sequence spaces:

$$\sum_{k=1}^{\infty} |x_k\,y_k| \le \left( \sum_{k=1}^{\infty} |x_k|^p \right)^{\frac{1}{p}} \left( \sum_{k=1}^{\infty} |y_k|^q \right)^{\frac{1}{q}}
\text{ for all }(x_k)_{k\in\mathbb N}, (y_k)_{k\in\mathbb N}\in\mathbb{R}^{\mathbb N}\text{ or }\mathbb{C}^{\mathbb N}.$$

=== Lebesgue measure ===
If $S$ is a measurable subset of $\R^n$ with the Lebesgue measure, and $f$ and $g$ are measurable real- or complex-valued functions on $S$, then Hölder's inequality is

$$\int_S \bigl| f(x)g(x)\bigr| \,\mathrm{d}x \le\biggl(\int_S |f(x)|^p\,\mathrm{d}x\biggr)^{\frac{1}{p}} \biggl(\int_S |g(x)|^q\,\mathrm{d}x\biggr)^{\frac{1}{q}}.$$

=== Probability measure ===
For the probability space $(\Omega, \mathcal{F}, \mathbb{P}),$ let $\mathbb{E}$ denote the expectation operator. For real- or complex-valued random variables $X$ and $Y$ on $\Omega,$ Hölder's inequality reads

$$\mathbb{E}[|XY|] \leqslant \left (\mathbb{E}\bigl[ |X|^p\bigr]\right)^{\frac{1}{p}} \left(\mathbb{E}\bigl[|Y|^q\bigr]\right)^{\frac{1}{q}}.$$

Let $1 < r < s < \infty$ and define $p = \tfrac{s}{r}.$ Then $q = \tfrac{p}{p-1}$ is the Hölder conjugate of $p.$ Applying Hölder's inequality to the random variables $|X|^r$ and $1_{\Omega}$ we obtain

$$\mathbb{E}\bigl[|X|^r\bigr]\leqslant \left(\mathbb{E}\bigl[|X|^s\bigr]\right)^{\frac{r}{s}}.$$

In particular, if the s^{th} absolute moment is finite, then the r^{th} absolute moment is finite, too. (This also follows from Jensen's inequality.)

=== Product measure ===
For two σ-finite measure spaces (S_{1}, Σ_{1}, μ_{1}) and (S_{2}, Σ_{2}, μ_{2}) define the product measure space by

$$S=S_1\times S_2,\quad \Sigma=\Sigma_1\otimes\Sigma_2,\quad \mu=\mu_1\otimes\mu_2,$$

where S is the Cartesian product of S_{1} and S_{2}, the σ-algebra Σ arises as product σ-algebra of Σ_{1} and Σ_{2}, and μ denotes the product measure of μ_{1} and μ_{2}. Then Tonelli's theorem allows us to rewrite Hölder's inequality using iterated integrals: If f and g are Σ-measurable real- or complex-valued functions on the Cartesian product S, then

$$\int_{S_1}\int_{S_2}|f(x,y)\,g(x,y)|\,\mu_2(\mathrm{d}y)\,\mu_1(\mathrm{d}x) \le\left(\int_{S_1}\int_{S_2}|f(x,y)|^p\,\mu_2(\mathrm{d}y)\,\mu_1(\mathrm{d}x)\right)^{\frac{1}{p}}\left(\int_{S_1}\int_{S_2}|g(x,y)|^q\,\mu_2(\mathrm{d}y)\,\mu_1(\mathrm{d}x)\right)^{\frac{1}{q}}.$$

This can be generalized to more than two σ-finite measure spaces.

=== Vector-valued functions ===
Let (S, Σ, μ) denote a σ-finite measure space and suppose that f = (f_{1}, ..., f_{n}) and g = (g_{1}, ..., g_{n}) are Σ-measurable functions on S, taking values in the n-dimensional real- or complex Euclidean space. By taking the product with the counting measure on {1, ..., n}, we can rewrite the above product measure version of Hölder's inequality in the form

$$\int_S \sum_{k=1}^n|f_k(x)\,g_k(x)|\,\mu(\mathrm{d}x) \le \left(\int_S\sum_{k=1}^n|f_k(x)|^p\,\mu(\mathrm{d}x)\right)^{\frac{1}{p}}\left(\int_S\sum_{k=1}^n|g_k(x)|^q\,\mu(\mathrm{d}x)\right)^{\frac{1}{q}}.$$

If the two integrals on the right-hand side are finite, then equality holds if and only if there exist real numbers α, β ≥ 0, not both of them zero, such that

$$\alpha \left (|f_1(x)|^p,\ldots,|f_n(x)|^p \right )= \beta \left (|g_1(x)|^q,\ldots,|g_n(x)|^q \right ),$$

for μ-almost all x in S.

This finite-dimensional version generalizes to functions f and g taking values in a normed space which could be for example a sequence space or an inner product space.

== Proof of Hölder's inequality ==
There are several proofs of Hölder's inequality; the main idea in the following is Young's inequality for products.

Proof

If ‖f ‖_{p} = 0, then f is zero μ-almost everywhere, and the product fg is zero μ-almost everywhere, hence the left-hand side of Hölder's inequality is zero. The same is true if ‖g‖_{q} = 0. Therefore, we may assume ‖f ‖_{p} > 0 and ‖g‖_{q} > 0 in the following.

If ‖f ‖_{p} = ∞ or ‖g‖_{q} = ∞, then the right-hand side of Hölder's inequality is infinite. Therefore, we may assume that ‖f ‖_{p} and ‖g‖_{q} are in (0, ∞).

If p = ∞ and q = 1, then |fg| ≤ ‖f ‖_{∞} |g| almost everywhere and Hölder's inequality follows from the monotonicity of the Lebesgue integral. Similarly for p = 1 and q = ∞. Therefore, we may assume p, q ∈ (1,∞).

We now use Young's inequality for products, which states that whenever $p,q$ are in (1,∞) with $\frac{1}{p} + \frac{1}{q} = 1$

$$a b \le \frac{a^p}p + \frac{b^q}q$$

for all nonnegative a and b, where equality is achieved if and only if a^{p} = b^{q}. Hence

$$\frac{|f(s)|}{\|f\|_p} \frac{|g(s)|}{\|g\|_q} \le \frac{|f(s)|^p}{p\|f\|_p^p} + \frac{|g(s)|^q}{q\|g\|_q^q}, \qquad s\in S.$$

Integrating both sides gives

$$\frac{\|fg\|_1}{||f||_p ||g||_q} \le \frac{\|f\|_p^p}{p \|f\|_p^p} + \frac{\|g\|_q^q}{q \|g\|_q^q} = \frac{1}{p} + \frac{1}{q} = 1,$$

which proves the claim.

Under the assumptions p ∈ (1, ∞) and ‖f ‖_{p} = ‖g‖_{q}, equality holds if and only if |f |^{p} = |g|^{q} almost everywhere. More generally, if ‖f ‖_{p} and ‖g‖_{q} are in (0, ∞), then Hölder's inequality becomes an equality if and only if there exist real numbers α, β > 0, namely

$$\alpha=\|g\|_q^q, \qquad \beta=\|f\|_p^p,$$

such that

$\alpha |f|^p = \beta |g|^q$ μ-almost everywhere (*).

The case ‖f ‖_{p} = 0 corresponds to β = 0 in (*). The case ‖g‖_{q} = 0 corresponds to α = 0 in (*).

Alternative proof using Jensen's inequality:

Proof

The function $x \mapsto x^p$ on (0,∞) is convex because $p\geq 1$, so by Jensen's inequality,

$$\int h\mathrm{d}\nu\leq\left(\int h^p\mathrm{d}\nu \right )^{\frac{1}{p}}$$

where ν is any probability distribution and h any ν-measurable function. Let μ be any measure, and ν the distribution whose density w.r.t. μ is proportional to $g^q$, i.e.

$$\mathrm{d}\nu = \frac{g^q}{\int g^q\,\mathrm{d}\mu}\mathrm{d}\mu$$

Hence we have, using $\frac{1}{p}+\frac{1}{q}=1$, hence $p(1-q)+q=0$, and letting $h=fg^{1-q}$,

$$\begin{align}\int fg\,\mathrm{d}\mu = & \left (\int g^q\,\mathrm{d}\mu \right )\int \underbrace{fg^{1-q}}_h\underbrace{\frac{g^q}{\int g^q\,\mathrm{d}\mu}\mathrm{d}\mu}_{\mathrm{d}\nu}\\
\leq & \left (\int g^q\mathrm{d}\mu \right ) \left (\int \underbrace{f^pg^{p(1-q)}}_{h^p}\underbrace{\frac{g^q}{\int g^q\,\mathrm{d}\mu}\,\mathrm{d}\mu}_{\mathrm{d}\nu} \right )^{\frac{1}{p}}\\
= & \left (\int g^q\,\mathrm{d}\mu \right ) \left (\int \frac{f^p}{\int g^q\,\mathrm{d}\mu}\,\mathrm{d}\mu \right )^{\frac{1}{p}} .
\end{align}$$

Finally, we get

$$\int fg\,\mathrm{d}\mu \leq \left(\int f^p\,\mathrm{d}\mu \right )^{\frac{1}{p}} \left(\int g^q\,\mathrm{d}\mu \right )^{\frac{1}{q}}$$

This assumes that f, g are real and non-negative, but the extension to complex functions is straightforward (use the modulus of f, g). It also assumes that $\|f\|_p,\|g\|_q$ are neither null nor infinity, and that $p,q > 1$: all these assumptions can also be lifted as in the proof above.

We could also bypass use of both Young's and Jensen's inequalities. The proof below also explains why and where the Hölder exponent comes in naturally.

Proof

As in the previous proof, it suffices to prove

$$\int_X |h|\mathrm{d}\nu\leq\left(\int_X |h|^p\mathrm{d}\nu \right )^{\frac{1}{p}}=\|h\|_p$$

where $\nu(X)=1$ and $h$ is $\nu$-measurable (real or complex) function on $X$. To prove this, we must bound $|h|$ by $|h|^p$. Obviously, there cannot exist a constant $C$ that would imply $|h(x)| ~\leq~ C|h(x)|^p$ for all $x$. The issue is for the values of $|h|$ near zero. Hence, we might hope to find an inequality of the form

$$|h(x)| ~\leq~ a'|h(x)|^p + b', \quad \text{for all} \quad x$$

for suitable choices of $a'$ and $b'$.

Next, we must remove possible dependence of $a'$ and $b'$ on $h$. Observe that we need to obtain $A:=\|h\|_p$ on the right-hand side after integrating the inequality above. By trial and error, we see that the inequality that we want should have the form

$$|h(x)| ~\leq~ aA^{1-p}|h(x)|^p + bA, \quad \text{for all} \quad x,$$

where $a, b$ are non-negative and $a+b=1$. Indeed, then the integral of the right-hand side will be precisely $A$. Thus, it remains to prove that such an inequality does hold with the right choice of universal constants $a,b$, which are in particular independent of $h$ and the measure.

The inequality we seek would follow from:

$$\tfrac{y}{A} ~\leq~ a(\tfrac{y}{A})^p + b, \quad \text{for all} \quad y>0,$$

which, in turn, is equivalent to

$$(*) \quad z ~\leq~ az^p + b, \quad \text{for all} \quad z>0.$$

It turns out that there is one and only one choice of $a, b$, subject to $a+b=1$, that makes the last inequality true: $a=\tfrac{1}{p}$ and $b=1-\tfrac{1}{p}$. (This is where Hölder conjugate exponent is born!) This validates the inequality at the first paragraph of this proof. Proof of Hölder's inequality follows from this, as in the previous proof.

Alternatively, we can deduce Young's inequality and then resort to the first proof given above. Young's inequality follows from the inequality (*) above by choosing $z=\tfrac{a}{b^{q-1}}$ and multiplying both sides by $b^{q}$.

== Extremal equality ==
=== Statement ===
Assume that 1 ≤ p < ∞ and let q denote the Hölder conjugate. Then for every f ∈ L^{p}(μ),

$$\|f\|_p = \max \left \{ \left| \int_S f g \, \mathrm{d}\mu \right | : g\in L^q(\mu), \|g\|_q \le 1 \right\},$$

where max indicates that there actually is a g maximizing the right-hand side. When p = ∞ and if each set A in the σ-field Σ with μ(A) = ∞ contains a subset B ∈ Σ with 0 < μ(B) < ∞ (which is true in particular when μ is σ-finite), then

$$\|f\|_\infty = \sup \left\{ \left| \int_S f g \,\mathrm{d}\mu \right| : g\in L^1(\mu), \|g\|_1 \le 1 \right \}.$$

Proof of the extremal equality:

Proof

By Hölder's inequality, the integrals are well defined and, for 1 ≤ p ≤ ∞,

$$\left |\int_S fg\,\mathrm{d}\mu\right|\le\int_S|fg|\,\mathrm{d}\mu\le\|f\|_p,$$

hence the left-hand side is always bounded above by the right-hand side.

Conversely, for 1 ≤ p ≤ ∞, observe first that the statement is obvious when ‖f ‖_{p} = 0. Therefore, we assume ‖f ‖_{p} > 0 in the following.

If 1 ≤ p < ∞, define g on S by

$$g(x) = \begin{cases}\|f\|_p^{1-p} \, |f(x)|^p / f(x)&\text{if }f(x)\not=0,\\ 0&\text{otherwise.}\end{cases}$$

By checking the cases p = 1 and 1 < p < ∞ separately, we see that ‖g‖_{q} = 1 and

$$\int_S f g \, \mathrm{d}\mu = \|f\|_p.$$

It remains to consider the case p = ∞. For ε ∈ (0, 1) define

$$A=\left \{x\in S:|f(x)|>(1-\varepsilon)\|f\|_\infty\right\}.$$

Since f is measurable, A ∈ Σ. By the definition of ‖f ‖_{∞} as the essential supremum of f and the assumption ‖f ‖_{∞} > 0, we have μ(A) > 0. Using the additional assumption on the σ-field Σ if necessary, there exists a subset B ∈ Σ of A with 0 < μ(B) < ∞. Define g on S by

$$g(x)=\begin{cases}\frac{1-\varepsilon}{\mu(B)}\frac{\|f\|_\infty}{f(x)}&\text{if }x\in B,\\0&\text{otherwise.}\end{cases}$$

Then g is well-defined, measurable and |g(x)| ≤ 1/μ(B) for x ∈ B, hence ‖g‖_{1} ≤ 1. Furthermore,

$$\left |\int_S fg\,\mathrm{d}\mu\right| = \int_B\frac{1-\varepsilon}{\mu(B)}\|f\|_\infty\,\mathrm{d}\mu = (1-\varepsilon)\|f\|_\infty.$$

=== Remarks and examples ===
- The equality for $p = \infty$ fails whenever there exists a set $A$ of infinite measure in the $\sigma$-field $\Sigma$ with that has no subset $B \in \Sigma$ that satisfies: $0 < \mu(B) < \infty.$ (the simplest example is the $\sigma$-field $\Sigma$ containing just the empty set and $S,$ and the measure $\mu$ with $\mu(S) = \infty.$) Then the indicator function $1_A$ satisfies $\|1_A\|_{\infty} = 1,$ but every $g \in L^1 (\mu)$ has to be $\mu$-almost everywhere constant on $A,$ because it is $\Sigma$-measurable, and this constant has to be zero, because $g$ is $\mu$-integrable. Therefore, the above supremum for the indicator function $1_A$ is zero and the extremal equality fails.
- The extremal inequality for $p \in [1,\infty)$ is an example of a more general result about Banach spaces which follows from the Hahn-Banach theorem: if $V$ is a Banach space and $V^*$is its dual space, then $\forall x \in V, \, \| x \|_V = \sup_{\| f \|_{V^*} = 1} |f(x)|$.
- For $p = \infty,$ the supremum is in general not attained. As an example, let $S = \mathbb{N}, \Sigma = \mathcal{P}(\mathbb{N})$ and $\mu$ the counting measure. Define:

$$\begin{cases} f: \mathbb{N} \to \mathbb{R} \\ f(n) = \frac{n-1}{n} \end{cases}$$

Then $\|f\|_{\infty} = 1.$ For $g \in L^1 (\mu, \mathbb{N})$ with $0 < \|g\|_1 \leqslant 1,$ let $m$ denote the smallest natural number with $g(m) \neq 0.$ Then

$$\left |\int_S fg\,\mathrm{d}\mu\right| \leqslant \frac{m-1}{m}|g(m)|+\sum_{n=m+1}^\infty|g(n)| = \|g\|_1-\frac{|g(m)|}m<1.$$

=== Applications ===
- The extremal equality is one of the ways for proving the triangle inequality ‖f_{1} + f_{2}‖_{p} ≤ ‖f_{1}‖_{p} + ‖f_{2}‖_{p} for all f_{1} and f_{2} in L^{p}(μ), see Minkowski inequality.
- Hölder's inequality implies that every f ∈ L^{p}(μ) defines a bounded (or continuous) linear functional κ_{f} on L^{q}(μ) by the formula

$$\kappa_f(g) = \int_S f g \, \mathrm{d}\mu,\qquad g\in L^q(\mu).$$

The extremal equality (when true) shows that the norm of this functional κ_{f} as element of the continuous dual space L^{q}(μ)^{*} coincides with the norm of f in L^{p}(μ) (see also the L^{p}-space article).

== Generalization with more than two functions ==
=== Statement ===
Assume that r ∈ (0, ∞] and p_{1}, ..., p_{n} ∈ (0, ∞] such that

$$\sum_{k=1}^n \frac1{p_k} = \frac1r$$

where 1/∞ is interpreted as 0 in this equation, and r=∞ implies p_{1}, ..., p_{n} ∈ (0, ∞] are all equal to ∞. Then, for all measurable real or complex-valued functions f_{1}, ..., f_{n} defined on S,

$$\left\|\prod_{k=1}^n f_k\right\|_r \le \prod_{k=1}^n \left\|f_k\right\|_{p_k}$$

where we interpret any product with a factor of ∞ as ∞ if all factors are positive, but the product is 0 if any factor is 0.

In particular, if $f_k \in L^{p_k}(\mu)$ for all $k \in \{ 1, \ldots, n \}$ then $\prod_{k=1}^n f_k \in L^r(\mu).$

Note: For $r \in (0, 1),$ contrary to the notation, ‖.‖_{r} is in general not a norm because it doesn't satisfy the triangle inequality.

Proof of the generalization:

Proof

We use Hölder's inequality and mathematical induction. If $n = 1$ then the result is immediate. Let us now pass from $n - 1$ to $n.$ Without loss of generality assume that $p_1 \leq \cdots \leq p_n.$

Case 1: If $p_n = \infty$ then

$$\sum_{k=1}^{n-1} \frac1{p_k} = \frac1r.$$

Pulling out the essential supremum of |f_{n}| and using the induction hypothesis, we get

$$\begin{align}
\left\|f_1 \cdots f_n \right\|_r
&\le \left\|f_1 \cdots f_{n-1}\right\|_r \left\|f_n\right\|_{\infty}\\
&\le \left\|f_1\right\|_{p_1} \cdots \left\|f_{n-1}\right\|_{p_{n-1}} \left\|f_n\right\|_{\infty}.
\end{align}$$

Case 2: If $p_n < \infty$ then necessarily $r < \infty$ as well, and then

$$p := \frac{p_n}{p_n-r}, \qquad q := \frac{p_n}r$$

are Hölder conjugates in (1, ∞). Application of Hölder's inequality gives

$$\left \||f_1 \cdots f_{n-1}|^r\,|f_n|^r\right \|_1 \le \left \||f_1 \cdots f_{n-1}|^r\right\|_p\,\left \||f_n|^r\right \|_q.$$

Raising to the power $1/r$ and rewriting,

$$\|f_1 \cdots f_n\|_r \le \|f_1 \cdots f_{n-1}\|_{pr} \|f_n\|_{qr}.$$

Since $q r = p_n$ and

$$\sum_{k=1}^{n-1} \frac1{p_k} = \frac1r-\frac1{p_n} = \frac{p_n-r}{rp_n} = \frac1{pr},$$

the claimed inequality now follows by using the induction hypothesis.

=== Interpolation ===
Let p_{1}, ..., p_{n} ∈ (0, ∞] and let θ_{1}, ..., θ_{n} ∈ (0, 1) denote weights with θ_{1} + ... + θ_{n} = 1. Define $p$ as the weighted harmonic mean, that is,

$$\frac1p = \sum_{k=1}^n \frac{\theta_k}{p_k}.$$

Given measurable real- or complex-valued functions $f_k$ on S, then the above generalization of Hölder's inequality gives

$$\left\| |f_1|^{\theta_1}\cdots |f_n|^{\theta_n}\right\|_p \le \left\||f_1|^{\theta_1}\right\|_{\frac{p_1}{\theta_1}}\cdots \left\| |f_n|^{\theta_n}\right\|_{\frac{p_n}{\theta_n}} = \|f_1\|_{p_1}^{\theta_1}\cdots \|f_n\|_{p_n}^{\theta_n}.$$

In particular, taking $f_1 = \cdots = f_n=:f$ gives

$$\|f\|_p \leqslant \prod_{k=1}^n \|f\|_{p_k}^{\theta_k}.$$

Specifying further θ_{1} = θ and θ_{2} = 1-θ, in the case $n = 2,$ we obtain the interpolation result

Littlewood's inequality—For $\theta\in(0,1)$ and $\frac {1}{p_\theta} = \frac{\theta}{p_1} + \frac {1-\theta}{p_0}$,

$$\|f\|_{p_\theta} \leqslant \|f\|_{p_1}^\theta \cdot \|f\|_{p_0}^{1-\theta},$$

An application of Hölder gives

Lyapunov's inequality—If $p = (1-\theta) p_0 + \theta p_1, \qquad \theta \in (0, 1),$ then

$$\left\| |f_0|^{\frac{p_0(1-\theta)}{p}} \cdot |f_1|^{\frac{p_1 \theta}{p}}\right\|_p^p \le \|f_0\|_{p_0}^{p_0(1-\theta)} \|f_1\|_{p_1}^{p_1\theta}$$

and in particular

$$\|f\|_p^p \leqslant \|f\|_{p_0}^{p_0(1-\theta)} \cdot \|f\|_{p_1}^{p_1\theta}.$$

Both Littlewood and Lyapunov imply that if $f \in L^{p_0}\cap L^{p_1}$ then $f \in L^p$ for all $p_0 < p < p_1.$

== Reverse Hölder inequalities ==
=== Two functions ===
Assume that p ∈ (1, ∞) and that the measure space (S, Σ, μ) satisfies μ(S) > 0. Then for all measurable real- or complex-valued functions f and g on S such that g(s) ≠ 0 for μ-almost all s ∈ S,

$$\|fg\|_1\geqslant \|f\|_{\frac{1}{p}}\,\|g\|_{\frac{-1}{p-1}}.$$

If

$$\|fg\|_1 < \infty \quad \text{and} \quad \|g\|_{\frac{-1}{p-1}} > 0,$$

then the reverse Hölder inequality is an equality if and only if

$$\exists \alpha \geqslant 0 \quad |f| = \alpha|g|^{\frac{-p}{p-1}} \qquad \mu\text{-almost everywhere}.$$

Note: The expressions:

$\|f\|_{\frac{1}{p}}$ and $\|g\|_{\frac{-1}{p-1}},$

are not norms, they are just compact notations for

$$\left (\int_S|f|^{\frac{1}{p}}\,\mathrm{d}\mu\right)^{p} \quad \text{and} \quad \left (\int_S|g|^{\frac{-1}{p-1}}\,\mathrm{d}\mu\right)^{-(p-1)}.$$

Proof of the reverse Hölder inequality (hidden, click show to reveal.)

Note that p and

$$q:=\frac{p}{p-1}\in(1,\infty)$$

are Hölder conjugates. Application of Hölder's inequality gives

$$\begin{align}
\left \||f|^{\frac{1}{p}}\right \|_1 &= \left \||fg|^{\frac{1}{p}}\,|g|^{-\frac{1}{p}}\right \|_1\\
&\leqslant \left \| |fg|^{\frac{1}{p}} \right \|_p \left \| |g|^{-\frac{1}{p}}\right \|_q \\
&=\|fg\|_1^{\frac{1}{p}}\left \||g|^{\frac{-1}{p-1}}\right \|_1^{\frac{p-1}{p}}
\end{align}$$

Raising to the power p gives us:

$$\left \||f|^{\frac{1}{p}}\right \|_1^p \leqslant \|fg\|_1  \left \||g|^{\frac{-1}{p-1}}\right \|_1^{p-1}.$$

Therefore:

$$\left \||f|^{\frac{1}{p}}\right \|_1^p   \left \||g|^{\frac{-1}{p-1}}\right \|_1^{-(p-1)} \leqslant \|fg\|_1 .$$

Now we just need to recall our notation.

Since g is not almost everywhere equal to the zero function, we can have equality if and only if there exists a constant α ≥ 0 such that |fg| = α |g|^{−q/p} almost everywhere. Solving for the absolute value of f gives the claim.

=== Multiple functions ===
The Reverse Hölder inequality (above) can be generalized to the case of multiple functions if all but one conjugate is negative. That is,

Let $p_1,..., p_{m-1} < 0$ and $p_m \in \mathbb{R}$ be such that $\sum_{k=1}^{m} \frac{1}{p_k} = 1$ (hence $0 < p_m < 1$). Let $f_k$ be measurable functions for $k = 1,...,m$. Then

$$\left\|\prod_{k=1}^m f_k\right\|_1 \ge \prod_{k=1}^m \left\|f_k\right\|_{p_k}.$$

This follows from the symmetric form of the Hölder inequality (see below).

== Symmetric forms of Hölder inequality ==
It was observed by Aczél and Beckenbach that Hölder's inequality can be put in a more symmetric form, at the price of introducing an extra vector (or function):

Let $f = (f(1),\dots,f(m)) , g = (g(1),\dots, g(m)), h = (h(1),\dots,h(m))$ be vectors with positive entries and such that $f(i) g(i) h(i) = 1$ for all $i$. If $p,q,r$ are nonzero real numbers such that $\frac{1}{p}+\frac{1}{q}+\frac{1}{r}=0$, then:

- $\|f\|_p \|g\|_q \|h\|_r \ge 1$ if all but one of $p,q,r$ are positive;
- $\|f\|_p \|g\|_q \|h\|_r \le 1$ if all but one of $p,q,r$ are negative.

The standard Hölder inequality follows immediately from this symmetric form (and in fact is easily seen to be equivalent to it). The symmetric statement also implies the reverse Hölder inequality (see above).

The result can be extended to multiple vectors:

Let $f_1, \dots, f_n$ be $n$ vectors in $\mathbb{R}^m$ with positive entries and such that $f_1(i) \dots f_n(i) = 1$ for all $i$. If $p_1,\dots,p_n$ are nonzero real numbers such that $\frac{1}{p_1}+\dots+\frac{1}{p_n}=0$, then:

- $\|f_1\|_{p_1} \dots \|f_n\|_{p_n} \ge 1$ if all but one of the numbers $p_i$ are positive;
- $\|f_1\|_{p_1} \dots \|f_n\|_{p_n} \le 1$ if all but one of the numbers $p_i$ are negative.

As in the standard Hölder inequalities, there are corresponding statements for infinite sums and integrals.

== Conditional Hölder inequality ==
Let (Ω, F, $\mathbb{P}$) be a probability space, G ⊂ F a sub-σ-algebra, and p, q ∈ (1, ∞) Hölder conjugates, meaning that 1/p + 1/q = 1. Then for all real- or complex-valued random variables X and Y on Ω,

$$\mathbb{E}\bigl[|XY|\big|\,\mathcal{G}\bigr] \le \bigl(\mathbb{E}\bigl[|X|^p\big|\,\mathcal{G}\bigr]\bigr)^{\frac{1}{p}} \,\bigl(\mathbb{E}\bigl[|Y|^q\big|\,\mathcal{G}\bigr]\bigr)^{\frac{1}{q}}
\qquad\mathbb{P}\text{-almost surely.}$$

Remarks:

- If a non-negative random variable Z has infinite expected value, then its conditional expectation is defined by

$$\mathbb{E}[Z|\mathcal{G}] = \sup_{n\in\mathbb{N}}\,\mathbb{E}[\min\{Z,n\}|\mathcal{G}]\quad\text{a.s.}$$

- On the right-hand side of the conditional Hölder inequality, 0 times ∞ as well as ∞ times 0 means 0. Multiplying a > 0 with ∞ gives ∞.

Proof of the conditional Hölder inequality:

Proof

Define the random variables

$$U=\bigl(\mathbb{E}\bigl[|X|^p\big|\,\mathcal{G}\bigr]\bigr)^{\frac{1}{p}},\qquad V=\bigl(\mathbb{E}\bigl[|Y|^q\big|\,\mathcal{G}\bigr]\bigr)^{\frac{1}{q}}$$

and note that they are measurable with respect to the sub-σ-algebra. Since

$$\mathbb{E}\bigl[|X|^p1_{\{U=0\}}\bigr] = \mathbb{E}\bigl[1_{\{U=0\}}\underbrace{\mathbb{E}\bigl[|X|^p\big|\,\mathcal{G}\bigr]}_{=\,U^p}\bigr]=0,$$

it follows that |X| = 0 a.s. on the set {U = 0}. Similarly, |Y| = 0 a.s. on the set {V = 0}, hence

$$\mathbb{E}\bigl[|XY|\big|\,\mathcal{G}\bigr]=0\qquad\text{a.s. on }\{U=0\}\cup\{V=0\}$$

and the conditional Hölder inequality holds on this set. On the set

$$\{U=\infty, V>0\}\cup\{U>0, V=\infty\}$$

the right-hand side is infinite and the conditional Hölder inequality holds, too. Dividing by the right-hand side, it therefore remains to show that

$$\frac{\mathbb{E}\bigl[|XY|\big|\,\mathcal{G}\bigr]}{UV}\le1
\qquad\text{a.s. on the set }H:=\{0<U<\infty,\,0<V<\infty\}.$$

This is done by verifying that the inequality holds after integration over an arbitrary

$$G\in\mathcal{G},\quad G\subset H.$$

Using the measurability of U, V, 1_{G} with respect to the sub-σ-algebra, the rules for conditional expectations, Hölder's inequality and 1/p + 1/q = 1, we see that

$$\begin{align}
\mathbb{E}\biggl[\frac{\mathbb{E}\bigl[|XY|\big|\,\mathcal{G}\bigr]}{UV}1_G\biggr]
&=\mathbb{E}\biggl[\mathbb{E}\biggl[\frac{|XY|}{UV}1_G\bigg|\,\mathcal{G}\biggr]\biggr]\\
&=\mathbb{E}\biggl[\frac{|X|}{U}1_G\cdot\frac{|Y|}{V}1_G\biggr]\\
&\le\biggl(\mathbb{E}\biggl[\frac{|X|^p}{U^p}1_G\biggr]\biggr)^{\frac{1}{p}}
\biggl(\mathbb{E}\biggl[\frac{|Y|^q}{V^q}1_G\biggr]\biggr)^{\frac{1}{q}}\\
&=\biggl(\mathbb{E}\biggl[\underbrace{\frac{\mathbb{E}\bigl[|X|^p\big|\,\mathcal{G}\bigr]}{U^p}}_{=\,1\text{ a.s. on }G}1_G\biggr]\biggr)^{\frac{1}{p}}
\biggl(\mathbb{E}\biggl[\underbrace{\frac{\mathbb{E}\bigl[|Y|^q\big|\,\mathcal{G}\bigr]}{V^p}}_{=\,1\text{ a.s. on }G}1_G\biggr]\biggr)^{\frac{1}{q}}\\
&=\mathbb{E}\bigl[1_G\bigr].
\end{align}$$

== Hölder's inequality for increasing seminorms ==
Let S be a set and let $F(S, \mathbb{C})$ be the space of all complex-valued functions on S. Let N be an increasing seminorm on $F(S, \mathbb{C}),$ meaning that, for all real-valued functions $f, g \in F(S, \mathbb{C})$ we have the following implication (the seminorm is also allowed to attain the value ∞):

$$\forall s \in S \quad  f(s) \geqslant g(s) \geqslant 0  \qquad \Rightarrow \qquad  N(f) \geqslant N(g).$$

Then:

$$\forall f, g \in F(S, \mathbb{C}) \qquad N(|fg|) \leqslant \bigl(N(|f|^p)\bigr)^{\frac{1}{p}} \bigl(N(|g|^q)\bigr)^{\frac{1}{q}},$$

where the numbers $p$ and $q$ are Hölder conjugates.

Remark: If (S, Σ, μ) is a measure space and $N(f)$ is the upper Lebesgue integral of $|f|$ then the restriction of N to all Σ-measurable functions gives the usual version of Hölder's inequality.

== Distances based on Hölder inequality ==
Hölder inequality can be used to define statistical dissimilarity measures between probability distributions. Those Hölder divergences are projective: They do not depend on the normalization factor of densities.

== See also ==
- Cauchy–Schwarz inequality
- Minkowski inequality
- Jensen's inequality
- Young's inequality for products
- Clarkson's inequalities
- Brascamp–Lieb inequality
