= Young's inequality for products =

Mathematical concept

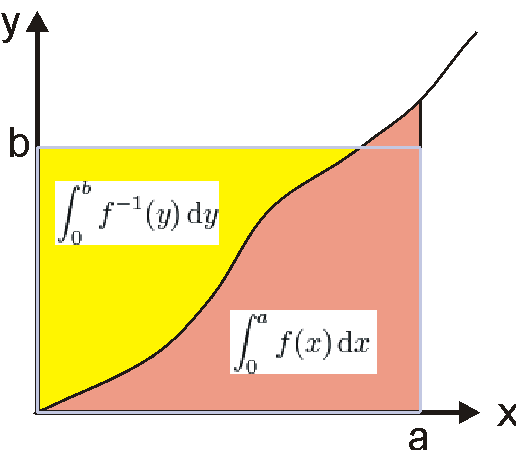
The area of the rectangle a,b can't be larger than sum of the areas under the functions $f$ (red) and $f^{-1}$ (yellow)

In mathematics, Young's inequality for products is a mathematical inequality about the product of two numbers. The inequality is named after William Henry Young and should not be confused with Young's convolution inequality.

Young's inequality for products can be used to prove Hölder's inequality. It is also widely used to estimate the norm of nonlinear terms in PDE theory, since it allows one to estimate a product of two terms by a sum of the same terms raised to a power and scaled.

== Standard version for conjugate Hölder exponents ==
The standard form of the inequality is the following, which can be used to prove Hölder's inequality.

Theorem—If $a \geq 0$ and $b \geq 0$ are non-negative real numbers and if $p > 1$ and $q > 1$ are real numbers such that

$$\frac{1}{p} + \frac{1}{q} = 1,$$

then

$$a b ~\leq~ \frac{a^p}{p} + \frac{b^q}{q}.$$

Equality holds if and only if $a^p = b^q.$

Proof

Since $\tfrac{1}{p} + \tfrac{1}{q} = 1,$, then $p - 1 = \tfrac{1}{q-1}.$ A graph $y = x^{p-1}$ on the $x y$-plane is thus also a graph $x = y^{q-1}.$ From sketching a visual representation of the integrals of the area between this curve and the axes, and the area in the rectangle bounded by the lines $x=0, x=a, y=0, y=b,$ and the fact that $y$ is always increasing for increasing $x$ and vice versa, we can see that $\textstyle\int^a_0 x^{p-1} \mathrm{d}x$ upper bounds the area of the rectangle below the curve (with equality when $b\ge a^{p-1}$) and $\textstyle\int^b_0 y^{q-1} \mathrm{d}y$ upper bounds the area of the rectangle above the curve (with equality when $b\le a^{p-1}$). Thus, $\textstyle\int^a_0 x^{p-1} \mathrm{d}x + \int^b_0 y^{q-1} \mathrm{d}y \geq ab,$ with equality when $b=a^{p-1}$ (or equivalently, $a^p=b^q$). Young's inequality follows from evaluating the integrals. (See below for a generalization.)

A second proof is via Jensen's inequality:

Proof

The claim is certainly true if $a = 0$ or $b = 0$ so henceforth assume that $a > 0$ and $b > 0.$ Set $t = 1/p$ and $(1 - t) = 1/q.$ Because the logarithm function is concave,

$$\ln\left(t a^p + (1-t) b^q\right) ~\geq~ t \ln\left(a^p\right) + (1-t) \ln\left(b^q\right) = \ln(ab)$$

with equality if and only if $a^p = b^q.$ Young's inequality follows by exponentiating.

Yet another proof is to first prove it with $b = 1$ and then apply the resulting inequality to $a/b^q$. The proof below illustrates also why Hölder conjugate exponent is the only possible parameter that makes Young's inequality hold for all non-negative values. The details follow:

Proof

Let $0 <\alpha<1$ and $\alpha + \beta = 1$. The inequality

$$x ~\leq~ \alpha x^p + \beta$$

holds for all $x\geq 0$ if and only if $\alpha = 1/p$ (and hence $\beta = 1/q$). This can be shown by convexity arguments or by simply minimizing the single-variable function.

To prove the full Young's inequality, clearly assume that $a > 0$ and $b > 0$. Apply the inequality above to $x=a/b^s$ to obtain:

$$\frac{a}{b^s} \leq \frac{1}{p}\frac{a^p}{b^{sp}} + \frac{1}{q}.$$

It is easy to see that choosing $s = q-1$ and multiplying both sides by $b^q$ yields Young's inequality.

Young's inequality may equivalently be written as
$$a^\alpha b^\beta \leq \alpha a + \beta b, \qquad\, 0 \leq \alpha, \beta \leq 1, \quad\ \alpha + \beta = 1.$$

Where this is just the concavity of the logarithm function. Equality holds if and only if $a = b$ or $\{\alpha, \beta\} = \{0, 1\}.$ This also follows from the weighted AM-GM inequality.

=== Generalizations ===
Theorem—Suppose $a > 0$ and $b > 0.$ If $1 < p < \infty$ and $q$ are such that $\tfrac{1}{p} + \tfrac{1}{q} = 1$ then
$$a b ~=~ \min_{0 < t < \infty} \left(\frac{t^p a^p}{p} + \frac{t^{-q} b^q}{q}\right).$$

Using $t := 1$ and replacing $a$ with $a^{1/p}$ and $b$ with $b^{1/q}$ results in the inequality:
$$a^{1/p} \, b^{1/q} ~\leq~ \frac{a}{p} + \frac{b}{q},$$
which is useful for proving Hölder's inequality.

Proof

Define a real-valued function $f$ on the positive real numbers by
$$f(t) ~=~ \frac{t^p a^p}{p} + \frac{t^{-q} b^q}{q}$$
for every $t > 0$ and then calculate its minimum.

Theorem—If $0 \leq p_i \leq 1$ with $\sum_i p_i = 1$ then
$$\prod_i {a_i}^{p_i} ~\leq~ \sum_i p_i a_i.$$
Equality holds if and only if all the $a_i$s with non-zero $p_i$s are equal.

== Elementary case ==
An elementary case of Young's inequality is the inequality with exponent $2,$
$$a b \leq \frac{a^2}{2} + \frac{b^2}{2},$$
which also gives rise to the so-called Young's inequality with $\varepsilon$ (valid for every $\varepsilon > 0$), sometimes called the Peter–Paul inequality. This name refers to the fact that tighter control of the second term is achieved at the cost of losing some control of the first term – one must "rob Peter to pay Paul"
$$a b ~\leq~ \frac{a^2}{2 \varepsilon} + \frac{\varepsilon b^2}{2}.$$

Proof: Young's inequality with exponent $2$ is the special case $p = q = 2.$ However, it has a more elementary proof.

Start by observing that the square of every real number is zero or positive. Therefore, for every pair of real numbers $a$ and $b$ we can write:
$$0 \leq (a-b)^2$$
Work out the square of the right hand side:
$$0 \leq a^2 - 2 a b + b^2$$
Add $2a b$ to both sides:
$$2 a b \leq a^2 + b^2$$
Divide both sides by 2 and we have Young's inequality with exponent $2:$
$$a b \leq \frac{a^2}{2} + \frac{b^2}{2}$$

Young's inequality with $\varepsilon$ follows by substituting $a'$ and $b'$ as below into Young's inequality with exponent $2$:
$$a' = a/\sqrt{\varepsilon}, \; b' = \sqrt{\varepsilon} b.$$

Young's inequality with $\varepsilon$ is an instance of the arithmetic mean–geometric mean inequality with two numbers.

== Matricial generalization ==
T. Ando proved a generalization of Young's inequality for complex matrices ordered by Loewner ordering. It states that for any pair $A, B$ of complex matrices of order $n$ there exists a unitary matrix $U$ such that
$$U^* |A B^*| U \preceq \tfrac{1}{p} |A|^p + \tfrac{1}{q} |B|^q,$$
where ${}^*$ denotes the conjugate transpose of the matrix and $|A| = \sqrt{A^* A}.$

== Standard version for increasing functions ==
For the standard version of the inequality, let $f$ denote a real-valued, continuous and strictly increasing function on $[0, c]$ with $c > 0$ and $f(0) = 0.$ Let $f^{-1}$ denote the inverse function of $f.$ Then, for all $a \in [0, c]$ and $b \in [0, f(c)],$
$$a b ~\leq~ \int_0^a f(x)\,dx + \int_0^b f^{-1}(x)\,dx$$
with equality if and only if $b = f(a).$

With $f(x) = x^{p-1}$ and $f^{-1}(y) = y^{q-1},$ this reduces to standard version for conjugate Hölder exponents.

For details and generalizations we refer to the paper of Mitroi & Niculescu.

== Generalization using Fenchel–Legendre transforms ==
By denoting the convex conjugate of a real function $f$ by $g,$ we obtain
$$a b ~\leq~ f(a) + g(b).$$
This follows immediately from the definition of the convex conjugate. For a convex function $f$ this also follows from the Legendre transformation.

More generally, if $f$ is defined on a real vector space $X$ and its convex conjugate is denoted by $f^\star$ (and is defined on the dual space $X^\star$), then
$$\langle u, v \rangle \leq f^\star(u) + f(v).$$
where $\langle \cdot , \cdot \rangle : X^\star \times X \to \Reals$ is the dual pairing.

=== Examples ===
The convex conjugate of $f(a) = a^p / p$ is $g(b) = b^q / q$ with $q$ such that $\tfrac{1}{p} + \tfrac{1}{q} = 1,$ and thus Young's inequality for conjugate Hölder exponents mentioned above is a special case.

The Legendre transform of $f(a) = e^a - 1$ is $g(b) = 1 - b + b \ln b$, hence $a b \leq e^a - b + b \ln b$ for all non-negative $a$ and $b.$ This estimate is useful in large deviations theory under exponential moment conditions, because $b \ln b$ appears in the definition of relative entropy, which is the rate function in Sanov's theorem.

== See also ==
- Convex conjugate – Generalization of the Legendre transformation
- Integral of inverse functions – Mathematical theorem, used in calculus
- Legendre transformation – Mathematical transformation
- Young's convolution inequality – Mathematical inequality about the convolution of two functions
