= Hugo Hadwiger =

Swiss mathematician (1908–1981)

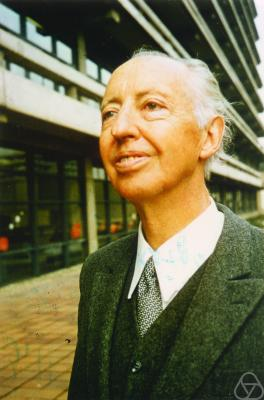
Hugo Hadwiger in 1973

Hugo Hadwiger (23 December 1908 in Karlsruhe, Germany – 29 October 1981 in Bern, Switzerland) was a Swiss mathematician, known for his work in geometry, combinatorics, and cryptography.

== Biography ==
Although born in Karlsruhe, Germany, Hadwiger grew up in Bern, Switzerland. He did his undergraduate studies at the University of Bern, where he majored in mathematics but also studied physics and actuarial science. He continued at Bern for his graduate studies, and received his Ph.D. in 1936 under the supervision of Willy Scherrer. He was for more than forty years a professor of mathematics at Bern.

== Mathematical concepts named after Hadwiger ==
Hadwiger's theorem in integral geometry classifies the isometry-invariant valuations on compact convex sets in d-dimensional Euclidean space. According to this theorem, any such valuation can be expressed as a linear combination of the intrinsic volumes; for instance, in two dimensions, the intrinsic volumes are the area, the perimeter, and the Euler characteristic.

The Hadwiger–Finsler inequality, proven by Hadwiger with Paul Finsler, is an inequality relating the side lengths and area of any triangle in the Euclidean plane. It generalizes Weitzenböck's inequality and was generalized in turn by Pedoe's inequality. In the same 1937 paper in which Hadwiger and Finsler published this inequality, they also published the Finsler–Hadwiger theorem on a square derived from two other squares that share a vertex.

Hadwiger's name is also associated with several important unsolved problems in mathematics:

- The Hadwiger conjecture in graph theory, posed by Hadwiger in 1943 and called by Bollobás, Catlin & Erdős (1980) “one of the deepest unsolved problems in graph theory,” describes a conjectured connection between graph coloring and graph minors. The Hadwiger number of a graph is the number of vertices in the largest clique that can be formed as a minor in the graph; the Hadwiger conjecture states that this is always at least as large as the chromatic number.
- The Hadwiger conjecture in combinatorial geometry concerns the minimum number of smaller copies of a convex body needed to cover the body, or equivalently the minimum number of light sources needed to illuminate the surface of the body; for instance, in three dimensions, it is known that any convex body can be illuminated by 16 light sources, but Hadwiger's conjecture implies that only eight light sources are always sufficient.
- The Hadwiger–Kneser–Poulsen conjecture states that, if the centers of a system of balls in Euclidean space are moved closer together, then the volume of the union of the balls cannot increase. It has been proven in the plane, but remains open in higher dimensions.
- The Hadwiger–Nelson problem concerns the minimum number of colors needed to color the points of the Euclidean plane so that no two points at unit distance from each other are given the same color. It was first proposed by Edward Nelson in 1950. Hadwiger popularized it by including it in a problem collection in 1961; already in 1945 he had published a related result, showing that any cover of the plane by five congruent closed sets contains a unit distance in one of the sets.

== Other mathematical contributions ==
Hadwiger proved a theorem characterizing eutactic stars, systems of points in Euclidean space formed by orthogonal projection of higher-dimensional cross polytopes. He found a higher-dimensional generalization of the space-filling Hill tetrahedra. And his 1957 book Vorlesungen über Inhalt, Oberfläche und Isoperimetrie was foundational for the theory of Minkowski functionals, used in mathematical morphology.

== Cryptographic work ==
Hadwiger was one of the principal developers of a Swiss rotor machine for encrypting military communications, known as NEMA. The Swiss, fearing that the Germans and Allies could read messages transmitted on their Enigma cipher machines, enhanced the system by using ten rotors instead of five. The system was used by the Swiss army and air force between 1947 and 1992.

== Awards and honors ==
Asteroid 2151 Hadwiger, discovered in 1977 by Paul Wild, is named after Hadwiger.

The first article in the "Research Problems" section of the American Mathematical Monthly was dedicated by Victor Klee to Hadwiger, on the occasion of his 60th birthday, in honor of Hadwiger's work editing a column on unsolved problems in the journal Elemente der Mathematik.

== Selected works ==
=== Books ===
- Altes und Neues über konvexe Körper, Birkhäuser 1955
- Vorlesungen über Inhalt, Oberfläche und Isoperimetrie, Springer, Grundlehren der mathematischen Wissenschaften, 1957
- with H. Debrunner, V. Klee Combinatorial Geometry in the Plane, Holt, Rinehart and Winston, New York 1964; Dover reprint 2015

=== Articles ===
- "Über eine Klassifikation der Streckenkomplexe", Vierteljahresschrift der Naturforschenden Gesellschaft Zürich, vol. 88, 1943, pp. 133–143 (Hadwiger's conjecture in graph theory)
- with Paul Glur Zerlegungsgleichheit ebener Polygone, Elemente der Math, vol. 6, 1951, pp. 97-106
- ''Ergänzungsgleichheit k-dimensionaler Polyeder'', Math. Zeitschrift, vol. 55, 1952, pp. 292-298
- ''Lineare additive Polyederfunktionale und Zerlegungsgleichheit, Math. Z., vol. 58, 1953, pp. 4-14''
- ''Zum Problem der Zerlegungsgleichheit k-dimensionaler Polyeder'', Mathematische Annalen vol. 127, 1954, pp. 170–174
