= Eutactic =

In mathematics, the word eutactic may refer to:

- Eutactic lattice
- Eutactic star
