= Hadwiger–Finsler inequality =

Inequality applicable to triangles

In mathematics, the Hadwiger–Finsler inequality is a result on the geometry of triangles in the Euclidean plane. It states that if a triangle in the plane has side lengths $a$, $b$ and $c$ and area $\Delta$, then

$a^{2} + b^{2} + c^{2} \geq (a - b)^{2} + (b - c)^{2} + (c - a)^{2} + 4 \sqrt{3}\, \Delta \quad \mbox{(HF)}.$

== Related inequalities ==
- Weitzenböck's inequality is a straightforward corollary of the Hadwiger–Finsler inequality: if a triangle in the plane has side lendths $a$, $b$ and $c$ and area $\Delta$, then

$a^{2} + b^{2} + c^{2} \geq 4 \sqrt{3}\, \Delta \quad \mbox{(W)}.$

Hadwiger–Finsler inequality is actually equivalent to Weitzenböck's inequality. Applying (W) to the circummidarc triangle gives (HF)

Weitzenböck's inequality can also be proved using Heron's formula, by which route it can be seen that equality holds in (W) if and only if the triangle is an equilateral triangle, i.e. $a=b=c$.

- A version for quadrilateral: Let $ABCD$ be a convex quadrilateral with the lengths $a, b, c, d$ and the area $T$ then:

$a^2+b^2+c^2+d^2 \ge 4T + \frac{\sqrt{3}-1}{\sqrt{3}}\sum{(a-b)^2}$
with equality only for a square.

Where $\sum{(a-b)^2}=(a-b)^2+(a-c)^2+(a-d)^2+(b-c)^2+(b-d)^2+(c-d)^2$

== Proof ==
From the cosines law we have:

$a^2=b^2+c^2-2bc\cos\alpha$

$\alpha$ being the angle between $b$ and $c$. This can be transformed into:

$a^2=(b-c)^2+2bc(1-\cos\alpha)$

Since $\Delta=\frac{1}{2}bc\sin\alpha$ we have:

$a^2=(b-c)^2+4\Delta\frac{(1-\cos\alpha)}{\sin\alpha}$

Now remember that

$1-\cos\alpha=2\sin^2\frac{\alpha}{2}$

and

$\sin\alpha=2\sin\frac{\alpha}{2}\cos\frac{\alpha}{2}$

Using this we get:

$a^2=(b-c)^2+4\Delta\tan\frac{\alpha}{2}$

Doing this for all sides of the triangle and adding up we get:

$a^2+b^2+c^2=(a-b)^2+(b-c)^2+(c-a)^2+4\Delta\Big(\tan\frac{\alpha}{2}+\tan\frac{\beta}{2}+\tan\frac{\gamma}{2}\Big)$

$\beta$ and $\gamma$ being the other angles of the triangle. Now since the halves of the triangle’s angles are less than $\pi/2$ the function $\tan$ is convex we have:

$\tan\frac{\alpha}{2}+\tan\frac{\beta}{2}+\tan\frac{\gamma}{2}\geq3\tan\frac{\alpha+\beta+\gamma}{6}=3\tan\frac{\pi}{6}=\sqrt{3}$

Using this we get:

$a^2 + b^2 + c^2 \geq (a-b)^2+(b-c)^2+(c-a)^2+ 4\sqrt{3}\, \Delta$

This is the Hadwiger-Finsler inequality.

== History ==
The Hadwiger–Finsler inequality is named after Paul Finsler and Hugo Hadwiger (1937), who also published in the same paper the Finsler–Hadwiger theorem on a square derived from two other squares that share a vertex.

== See also ==
- List of triangle inequalities
- Isoperimetric inequality
