= Finsler–Hadwiger theorem =

Describes a third square derived from any two squares that share a vertex

Finsler-Hadwiger theorem

The Finsler–Hadwiger theorem is a statement in Euclidean plane geometry that describes a third square derived from any two squares that share a vertex. The theorem is named after Paul Finsler and Hugo Hadwiger, who published it in 1937 as part of the same paper in which they published the Hadwiger–Finsler inequality relating the side lengths and area of a triangle.

== Statement ==
To state the theorem, suppose that ABCD and AB'C'D' are two squares with common vertex A. Let E and G be the midpoints of B'D and D'B respectively, and let F and H be the centers of the two squares. Then the theorem states that the quadrilateral EFGH is a square as well.

The square EFGH is called the Finsler–Hadwiger square of the two given squares. It is the midsquare of the midsquare quadrilateral B'DBD'.

== Application ==
Repeated application of the Finsler–Hadwiger theorem can be used to prove Van Aubel's theorem, on the congruence and perpendicularity of segments through centers of four squares constructed on the sides of an arbitrary quadrilateral. Each pair of consecutive squares forms an instance of the theorem, and the two pairs of opposite Finsler–Hadwiger squares of those instances form another two instances of the theorem, having the same derived square.
