= Ono's inequality =

Theorem about triangles

In mathematics, Ono's inequality is a theorem about triangles in the Euclidean plane. In its original form, as conjectured by Tôda Ono (小野藤太) in 1914, the inequality is actually false; however, the statement is true for acute triangles, as shown by F. Balitrand in 1916.

== Statement of the inequality ==
Consider an acute triangle (meaning a triangle with three acute angles) in the Euclidean plane with side lengths a, b and c and area S. Then

$$27 (b^2 + c^2 - a^2)^2 (c^2 + a^2 - b^2)^2 (a^2 + b^2 - c^2)^2 \leq (4 S)^6.$$

This inequality fails for general triangles (to which Ono's original conjecture applied), as shown by the counterexample $a=2, \, \, b=3, \, \, c=4, \, \, S=3\sqrt{15}/4.$

The inequality holds with equality in the case of an equilateral triangle, in which up to similarity we have sides $1,1,1$ and area $\sqrt{3}/4.$

== Proof ==
Dividing both sides of the inequality by $64(abc)^4$, we obtain:

$$27 \frac{(b^2 + c^2 - a^2)^2}{4b^2c^2} \frac{(c^2 + a^2 - b^2)^2}{4a^2c^2} \frac{(a^2 + b^2 - c^2)^2}{4a^2b^2} \leq \frac{4S^2}{b^2c^2} \frac{4S^2}{a^2c^2} \frac{4S^2}{a^2b^2}$$

Using the formula $S= \tfrac12 bc\sin{A}$ for the area of triangle, and applying the cosines law to the left side, we get:

$$27 (\cos{A} \cos{B} \cos{C})^2 \leq (\sin{A} \sin{B} \sin{C})^2$$

And then using the identity $\tan{A} + \tan{B} + \tan{C} = \tan{A} \tan{B} \tan{C}$ which is true for all triangles in euclidean plane, we transform the inequality above into:

$$27 (\tan{A} \tan{B} \tan{C}) \leq (\tan{A} + \tan{B} + \tan{C})^3$$

Since the angles of the triangle are acute, the tangent of each corner is positive, which means that the inequality above is correct by AM-GM inequality.

== See also ==
- List of triangle inequalities
