= Vasile Alecsandri National College (Bacău) =

High school in Bacău, Romania

Coordinates: 46.562357°N 26.908273°E

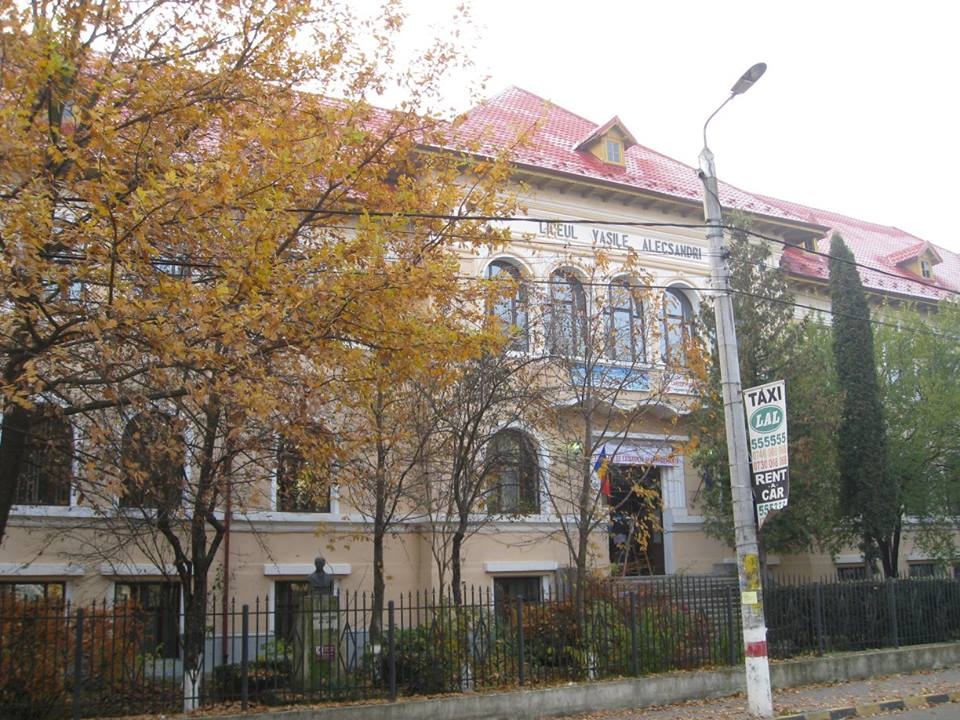
Vasile Alecsandri National College

Vasile Alecsandri National College (Romanian: Colegiul Național "Vasile Alecsandri") is a public day high school in Bacău, Romania, located at 37 Vasile Alecsandri Street.

Founded as a secondary school for girls in 1921, work on the building lasted from 1925 to 1934. Today, this is considered a historic monument by Romania's Ministry of Culture and Religious Affairs. In 1954, the institution became coeducational, and in 1959, it was named after poet Vasile Alecsandri. In 2001, it was granted the title of national college.

The institution publishes quarterly the International Journal of Geometry; the editor in chief is Cătălin Ionel Barbu, a professor at the college.
