= International Journal of Geometry =

- Discipline: Geometry
- Language: English
- Edited by: Cătălin Barbu

Publication details
- History: 2012–present
- Publisher: Vasile Alecsandri National College (Romania)
- Open access: Yes

Standard abbreviations
- ISO 4: Int. J. Geom.

Indexing
- ISSN: 2247-9880
- OCLC no.: 796218853

Links
- Journal homepage

The International Journal of Geometry is a peer-reviewed academic journal that covers Euclidean, Non-Euclidean and Discrete geometry.

It was established in 2012 with two volumes per year, and as of 2021 is published quarterly by the Department of Mathematics of the Vasile Alecsandri National College of Bacău. It is abstracted and indexed among others by Zentralblatt MATH, MathSciNet, the Electronic Journals Library and Ebsco. Its founding editor-in-chief is Cătălin Barbu, a professor of mathematics at the Vasile Alecsandri National College of Bacău.

== See also ==
- Forum Geometricorum
