= Lodge Corollary =

U.S. foreign policy doctrine

The Lodge Corollary was a corollary to the Monroe Doctrine. It forbade any foreign power or foreign interest of any kind from acquiring sufficient territory in the Western Hemisphere as to put that government in "practical power of control".

== Description ==
Proposed by Henry Cabot Lodge and ratified by the United States Senate in 1912, the Lodge Corollary to the Monroe Doctrine forbade any foreign power or foreign interest of any kind from acquiring sufficient territory in the Western Hemisphere as to put that government in "practical power of control". As Lodge argued, the corollary reaffirmed the basic right of nations to provide for their safety and extended the principles behind the Monroe Doctrine beyond colonialism to include corporate territorial acquisitions as well.

== Reactions ==
The proposal was a reaction to negotiations between a Japanese syndicate and Mexico for the purchase of a considerable portion of Baja California, including a harbor considered to be of strategic value: Magdalena Bay. After the ratification of the Lodge Corollary, Japan disavowed any connection to the syndicate, and the deal was never completed.
