= Perfect lattice =

Euclidean lattice

In mathematics, a perfect lattice (or perfect form) is a lattice in a Euclidean vector space, that is completely determined by the set S of its minimal vectors in the sense that there is only one positive definite quadratic form taking value 1 at all points of S. Perfect lattices were introduced by Korkine & Zolotareff (1877). A strongly perfect lattice is one whose minimal vectors form a spherical 4-design. This notion was introduced by Venkov (2001).

Voronoi (1908) proved that a lattice is extreme if and only if it is both perfect and eutactic.

The number of perfect lattices in dimensions 1, 2, 3, 4, 5, 6, 7, 8 is given by 1, 1, 1, 2, 3, 7, 33, 10916 (sequence A004026 in the OEIS). Conway & Sloane (1988) summarize the properties of perfect lattices of dimension up to 7. Sikirić, Schürmann & Vallentin (2007) verified that the list of 10916 perfect lattices in dimension 8 found by Martinet and others is complete. It was proven by Riener (2006) that only 2408 of these 10916 perfect lattices in dimension 8 are actually extreme lattices.
