= Erdős–Mordell inequality =

On sums of distances in triangles

The Erdős–Mordell inequality illustrated

In Euclidean geometry, the Erdős–Mordell inequality states that for any triangle $ABC$ and point $P$ inside $ABC$, the sum of the distances from $P$ to the sides is less than or equal to half of the sum of the distances from $P$ to the vertices. It is named after Paul Erdős and Louis Mordell. Erdős (1935) posed the problem of proving the inequality; a proof was provided two years later by Mordell and D. F. Barrow (1937). This solution was however not very elementary. Subsequent simpler proofs were then found by Kazarinoff (1957), Bankoff (1958), and Alsina & Nelsen (2007).

Barrow's inequality is a strengthened version of the Erdős–Mordell inequality in which the distances from $P$ to the sides are replaced by the distances from P to the points where the angle bisectors of $\angle APB$, $\angle BPC$, and $\angle CPA$ cross the sides. Although the replaced distances are longer, their sum is still less than or equal to half the sum of the distances to the vertices.

== Statement and proof ==
Let $P$ be an arbitrary point inside a given triangle $ABC$, and let $PL$, $PM$, and $PN$ be the perpendiculars from $P$ to the sides of the triangles. (If the triangle is obtuse, one of these perpendiculars may cross through a different side of the triangle and end on the line supporting one of the sides.) Then the inequality states that
$$PA+PB+PC\geq 2(PL+PM+PN).$$

The proof is as follows:

- Let the sides of $ABC$ be $a$, $b$, and $c$, which are opposite to the vertices $A$, $B$, and $C$. Let us denote the distance between internal point $P$ to all such three vertices as $PA = p$, $PB = q$, and $PC = r$, and the distance between internal point $P$ to all three sides of a triangle $ABC$, namely the distance from $P$ to $BC$ is $x$, to $CA$ is $y$, and to $AB$ is $z$. First, we prove that
  $$cr\geq ax+by.$$
  This is equivalent to
  $$\frac{c(r+z)}2\geq \frac{ax+by+cz}2.$$
- The right side is the area of triangle ABC, but on the left side, $r + z$ is at least the height of the triangle; consequently, the left side cannot be smaller than the right side. Now reflect $P$ on the angle bisector at $C$. We find that $cr \ge ay + bx$ for the reflection of $P$. Similarly, $bq \ge az + cx$ and $ap \ge bz + cy$. We solve these inequalities for $r$, $q$, and $p$:
  $$\begin{align} r &\geq (a/c)y+(b/c)x, \\
q &\geq (a/b)z+(c/b)x, \\
p &\geq (b/a)z+(c/a)y.\end{align}$$
- Adding the three up, we get
  $$p + q + r
\geq
\left( \frac{b}{c} + \frac{c}{b} \right) x +
\left( \frac{a}{c} + \frac{c}{a} \right) y +
\left( \frac{a}{b} + \frac{b}{a} \right) z.$$
- Since the sum of a positive number and its reciprocal is at least 2 by AM–GM inequality, we are finished. Equality holds only for the equilateral triangle, where $P$ is its centroid.

== Another strengthened version ==
Let $ABC$ be a triangle inscribed into a circle $O$, and $P$ be a point inside of $ABC$. Let $D$, $E$, and $F$ be the orthogonal projections of $P$ onto $BC$, $CA$, and $AB$. Points $M$, $N$, and $Q$ be the orthogonal projections of $P$ onto tangents to $O$ at points $A$, $B$, and $C$, respectively. Then,
$$PM+PN+PQ \ge 2(PD+PE+PF)$$
Equality hold if and only if triangle $ABC$ is equilateral.

== A generalization ==
Let $A_1A_2...A_n$ be a convex polygon, and $P$ be an interior point of $A_1A_2...A_n$. Let $R_i$ be the distance from $P$ to the vertex $A_i$, $r_i$ the distance from $P$ to the side $A_iA_{i+1}$, $w_i$ the segment of the bisector of the angle $A_iPA_{i+1}$ from $P$ to its intersection with the side $A_iA_{i+1}$ then
$$\sum_{i=1}^{n}R_i \ge \left(\sec{\frac{\pi}{n}}\right)\sum_{i=1}^{n} w_i \ge \left(\sec{\frac{\pi}{n}}\right)\sum_{i=1}^{n} r_i$$

== In absolute geometry ==
In absolute geometry the Erdős–Mordell inequality is equivalent, as proved in Pambuccian (2008), to the statement that the sum of the angles of a triangle is less than or equal to two right angles.

== See also ==
- List of triangle inequalities
