= Paul Finsler =

German and Swiss mathematician (1894–1970)

- Finsler (from a group portrait) at the International Mathematical Congress, Zürich, 1932
- Born: 11 April 1894; Heilbronn, Germany
- Died: 29 April 1970 (aged 76); Zurich, Switzerland
- Education: University of Göttingen
- Known for: Finsler manifold; Finsler's lemma; Finsler–Hadwiger theorem; Hadwiger–Finsler inequality; Non-well-founded set theory
- Scientific career
- Fields: Mathematics
- Workplaces: University of Zurich
- Academic advisors: Constantin Carathéodory

Paul Finsler (11 April 1894 – 29 April 1970) was a German and Swiss mathematician.

Born in Heilbronn, Germany, Finsler did his undergraduate studies at the Technische Hochschule Stuttgart, and his graduate studies at the University of Göttingen, where he received his Ph.D. in 1919 under the supervision of Constantin Carathéodory. He studied for his habilitation at the University of Cologne, receiving it in 1922. He joined the faculty of the University of Zurich in 1927, and was promoted to ordinary professor there in 1944. He died on 29 April 1970.

Finsler's thesis work concerned differential geometry, and Finsler spaces were named after him by Élie Cartan in 1934. The Hadwiger–Finsler inequality, a relation between the side lengths and area of a triangle in the Euclidean plane, is named after Finsler and his co-author Hugo Hadwiger, as is the Finsler–Hadwiger theorem on a square derived from two other squares that share a vertex. Finsler is also known for his work on the foundations of mathematics, developing a non-well-founded set theory with which he hoped to resolve the contradictions implied by Russell's paradox.

== Publications ==
- Finsler, Paul (1918), Über Kurven und Flächen in allgemeinen Räumen, Dissertation, Göttingen, JFM 46.1131.02 (Reprinted by Birkhäuser (1951))
- Finsler, Paul (1926). "Gibt es Widersprüche in der Mathematik?". Jahresbericht der Deutschen Mathematiker-Vereinigung. 34: 143–154.
- Finsler, Paul (1926). "Formale Beweise und die Entscheidbarkeit". Mathematische Zeitschrift. 25: 676–682. doi:10.1007/bf01283861. S2CID 121054124.
- Finsler, Paul (1926). "Über die Grundlegung der Mengenlehre. Erster Teil". Mathematische Zeitschrift. 25: 683–713. doi:10.1007/bf01283862. Finsler, Paul (1963). "Über die Grundlegung der Mengenlehre. Zweiter Teil". Commentarii Mathematici Helvetici. 38 (1): 172–218. doi:10.1007/bf02566915. S2CID 124928448.
- Finsler, P. (1933). "Die Existenz der Zahlenreihe und des Kontinuums". Commentarii Mathematici Helvetici. 5: 88–94. doi:10.1007/BF01297507. S2CID 120768947.
- Finsler: Aufsätze zur Mengenlehre. (ed. G. Unger) 1975.
- Booth, David; Ziegler, Renatus, eds. (1996). Finsler Set Theory: Platonism and Circularity. "Translation of Paul Finsler's papers on set theory with introductory comments". Birkhäuser Basel. doi:10.1007/978-3-0348-9031-1. ISBN 978-3-0348-9876-8.
