= David Francis Barrow =

American mathematician

- Born: November 14, 1888; Athens, Georgia
- Died: February 4, 1970 (aged 81)
- Education: The University of Georgia; Harvard University
- Known for: Barrow's inequality
- Scientific career
- Fields: Mathematics
- Workplaces: The University of Georgia; The University of Texas

David Francis Barrow (November 14, 1888 – February 4, 1970) was an American mathematician who introduced Barrow's inequality in 1937.

Barrow's father, David Crenshaw Barrow Jr., was also a mathematician, and served as chancellor of the University of Georgia from 1906 to 1925. His son, David F. Barrow, did his undergraduate studies at the University of Georgia and then studied at Harvard University, where he earned his PhD in 1913. After a year abroad, he taught for two years at the University of Texas, and then at the Sheffield Scientific School. After a brief stint in the U.S. armed services, he joined the faculty of his father's university in 1920. He became a full professor in 1923, and chaired the mathematics department in 1944–1945.

== Publications ==
- Erdős, Paul; Mordell, L. J.; Barrow, David F. (1937), "Solution to problem 3740", American Mathematical Monthly, 44 (4): 252–254, doi:10.2307/2300713, JSTOR 2300713
- "Can a robot calculate the table of logarithms?". In: The American Mathematical Monthly, Volume 49, No. 10 (Dec., 1942), pp. 671–673 (JSTOR)
