= Barrow's inequality =

In geometry, Barrow's inequality is an inequality relating the distances between an arbitrary point within a triangle, the vertices of the triangle, and certain points on the sides of the triangle. It is named after David Francis Barrow.

== Statement ==
Let P be an arbitrary point inside the triangle ABC. From P and ABC, define U, V, and W as the points where the angle bisectors of BPC, CPA, and APB intersect the sides BC, CA, AB, respectively. Then Barrow's inequality states that

$$PA+PB+PC\geq 2(PU+PV+PW),\,$$

with equality holding only in the case of an equilateral triangle and P is the center of the triangle.

== Generalisation ==
Barrow's inequality can be extended to convex polygons. For a convex polygon with vertices $A_1,A_2,\ldots ,A_n$ let $P$ be an inner point and $Q_1, Q_2,\ldots ,Q_n$ the intersections of the angle bisectors of $\angle A_1PA_2,\ldots,\angle A_{n-1}PA_n,\angle A_nPA_1$ with the associated polygon sides $A_1A_2,\ldots ,A_{n-1}A_n, A_nA_1$, then the following inequality holds:

$$\sum_{k=1}^n|PA_k|\geq \sec\left(\frac{\pi}{n}\right) \sum_{k=1}^n|PQ_k|$$

Here $\sec(x)$ denotes the secant function. For the triangle case $n=3$ the inequality becomes Barrow's inequality due to $\sec\left(\tfrac{\pi}{3}\right)=2$.

== History ==
Barrow strengthening Erdős-Mordell $$\begin{align}&\quad\, |PA|+|PB|+|PC| \\ &\ge 2 (|PQ_a|+|PQ_b|+|PQ_c|)\\  &\ge 2 (|PF_a|+|PF_b|+|PF_c|)\end{align}$$

Barrow's inequality strengthens the Erdős–Mordell inequality, which has identical form except with PU, PV, and PW replaced by the three distances of P from the triangle's sides. It is named after David Francis Barrow. Barrow's proof of this inequality was published in 1937, as his solution to a problem posed in the American Mathematical Monthly of proving the Erdős–Mordell inequality. This result was named "Barrow's inequality" as early as 1961.

A simpler proof was later given by Louis J. Mordell.

== See also ==
- Euler's theorem in geometry
- List of triangle inequalities
