= Weitzenböck's inequality =

Inequality applying to triangles

According to Weitzenböck's inequality, the area of this triangle is at most (a^{2} + b^{2} + c^{2}) / 4√3.

$$\begin{align}&\text{all inner angles} < 120^\circ : \\ &\text{grey area} = 3 \Delta \leq \Delta_a+\Delta_b+\Delta_c \end{align}$$

$$\begin{align}&\text{one inner angle} \geq 120^\circ : \\ &\text{grey area} = 3 \Delta \leq \Delta_c < \Delta_a+\Delta_b+\Delta_c \end{align}$$

In mathematics, Weitzenböck's inequality, named after Roland Weitzenböck, states that for a triangle of side lengths $a$, $b$, $c$, and area $\Delta$, the following inequality holds:

$$a^2 + b^2 + c^2 \geq 4\sqrt{3}\, \Delta.$$

Equality occurs if and only if the triangle is equilateral. Pedoe's inequality is a generalization of Weitzenböck's inequality. The Hadwiger–Finsler inequality is a strengthened version of Weitzenböck's inequality.

== Geometric interpretation and proof ==
Rewriting the inequality above allows for a more concrete geometric interpretation, which in turn provides an immediate proof.

$$\frac{\sqrt{3}}{4}a^2 + \frac{\sqrt{3}}{4}b^2 + \frac{\sqrt{3}}{4}c^2 \geq 3\, \Delta.$$

Now the summands on the left side are the areas of equilateral triangles erected over the sides of the original triangle and hence the inequation states that the sum of areas of the equilateral triangles is always greater than or equal to threefold the area of the original triangle.

$$\Delta_a + \Delta_b + \Delta_c \geq 3\, \Delta.$$

This can now be shown by replicating area of the triangle three times within the equilateral triangles. To achieve that the Fermat point is used to partition the triangle into three obtuse subtriangles with a $120^\circ$ angle and each of those subtriangles is replicated three times within the equilateral triangle next to it. This only works if every angle of the triangle is smaller than $120^\circ$, since otherwise the Fermat point is not located in the interior of the triangle and becomes a vertex instead. However if one angle is greater or equal to $120^\circ$ it is possible to replicate the whole triangle three times within the largest equilateral triangle, so the sum of areas of all equilateral triangles stays greater than the threefold area of the triangle anyhow.

== Further proofs ==
The proof of this inequality was set as a question in the International Mathematical Olympiad of 1961. Even so, the result is not too difficult to derive using Heron's formula for the area of a triangle:

$$\begin{align}
\Delta & {} =\frac{1}{4}\sqrt{(a+b+c)(a+b-c)(b+c-a)(c+a-b)} \\[4pt]
& {} =\frac{1}{4}\sqrt{2(a^2 b^2+a^2c^2+b^2c^2)-(a^4+b^4+c^4)}.
\end{align}$$

=== First method ===
It can be shown that the area of the inner Napoleon's triangle, which must be nonnegative, is

$$\frac{\sqrt{3}}{24}(a^2+b^2+c^2-4\sqrt{3}\Delta),$$

so the expression in parentheses must be greater than or equal to 0.

=== Second method ===
This method assumes no knowledge of inequalities except that all squares are nonnegative.

$$\begin{align}
{} & (a^2 - b^2)^2 + (b^2 - c^2)^2 + (c^2 - a^2)^2 \geq 0 \\[5pt]
{} \iff & 2(a^4+b^4+c^4) - 2(a^2 b^2+a^2c^2+b^2c^2) \geq 0 \\[5pt]
{} \iff & \frac{4(a^4+b^4+c^4)}{3} \geq \frac{4(a^2 b^2+a^2c^2+b^2c^2)}{3} \\[5pt]
{} \iff & \frac{(a^4+b^4+c^4) + 2(a^2 b^2+a^2c^2+b^2c^2)}{3} \geq 2(a^2 b^2+a^2c^2+b^2c^2)-(a^4+b^4+c^4) \\[5pt]
{} \iff & \frac{(a^2 + b^2 + c^2)^2}{3} \geq (4\Delta)^2,
\end{align}$$

and the result follows immediately by taking the positive square root of both sides. From the first inequality we can also see that equality occurs only when $a = b = c$ and the triangle is equilateral.

=== Third method ===
This proof assumes knowledge of the AM–GM inequality.

$$\begin{align}
& & (a-b)^2+(b-c)^2+(c-a)^2 & \geq & & 0 \\
\iff & & 2a^2+2b^2+2c^2 & \geq & & 2ab+2bc+2ac \\
\iff & & 3(a^2+b^2+c^2) & \geq & & (a + b + c)^2 \\
\iff & & a^2+b^2+c^2 & \geq & & \sqrt{3(a+b+c)\left(\frac{a+b+c}{3}\right)^3} \\
\Rightarrow & & a^2+b^2+c^2 & \geq & & \sqrt{3 (a+b+c)(-a+b+c)(a-b+c)(a+b-c)} \\
\iff & & a^2+b^2+c^2 & \geq & & 4 \sqrt3 \Delta.
\end{align}$$

As we have used the arithmetic-geometric mean inequality, equality only occurs when $a = b = c$ and the triangle is equilateral.

=== Fourth method ===
Write $x=\cot A, c=\cot A+\cot B>0$ so the sum $S=\cot A+\cot B+\cot C=c+\frac{1-x(c-x)}{c}$ and $cS=c^2-xc+x^2+1=\left(x-\frac{c}{2}\right)^2+\left(\frac{c\sqrt{3}}{2}-1\right)^2+c\sqrt{3}\ge c\sqrt{3}$ i.e. $S\ge\sqrt{3}$. But $\cot A=\frac{b^2+c^2-a^2}{4\Delta}$, so $S=\frac{a^2+b^2+c^2}{4\Delta}$.

== See also ==
- List of triangle inequalities
- Isoperimetric inequality
- Hadwiger–Finsler inequality

== References & further reading ==
- Claudi Alsina, Roger B. Nelsen: When Less is More: Visualizing Basic Inequalities. MAA, 2009, ISBN 9780883853429, pp. 84-86
- Claudi Alsina, Roger B. Nelsen: Geometric Proofs of the Weitzenböck and Hadwiger–Finsler Inequalities. Mathematics Magazine, Vol. 81, No. 3 (Jun., 2008), pp. 216–219 (JSTOR)
- D. M. Batinetu-Giurgiu, Nicusor Minculete, Nevulai Stanciu: Some geometric inequalities of Ionescu-Weitzebböck type. International Journal of Geometry, Vol. 2 (2013), No. 1, April
- D. M. Batinetu-Giurgiu, Nevulai Stanciu: The inequality Ionescu - Weitzenböck. MateInfo.ro, April 2013, (online copy)
- Daniel Pedoe: On Some Geometrical Inequalities. The Mathematical Gazette, Vol. 26, No. 272 (Dec., 1942), pp. 202-208 (JSTOR)
- Roland Weitzenböck: Über eine Ungleichung in der Dreiecksgeometrie. Mathematische Zeitschrift, Volume 5, 1919, pp. 137-146 (online copy at Göttinger Digitalisierungszentrum)
- Dragutin Svrtan, Darko Veljan: Non-Euclidean Versions of Some Classical Triangle Inequalities. Forum Geometricorum, Volume 12, 2012, pp. 197–209 (online copy)
- Mihaly Bencze, Nicusor Minculete, Ovidiu T. Pop: New inequalities for the triangle. Octogon Mathematical Magazine, Vol. 17, No.1, April 2009, pp. 70-89 (online copy)
