= Eutactic star =

Geometrical figure in a Euclidean space

A eutactic star consisting of 5 pairs of vectors in three-dimensional space (n = 3, s = 5)

In Euclidean geometry, a eutactic star is a geometrical figure in a Euclidean space. A star is a figure consisting of any number of opposing pairs of vectors (or arms) issuing from a central origin. A star is eutactic if it is the orthogonal projection of plus and minus the set of standard basis vectors (i.e., the vertices of a cross-polytope) from a higher-dimensional space onto a subspace. Such stars were called "eutactic" – meaning "well-situated" or "well-arranged" – by Schläfli (1901, p. 134) because, for a common scalar multiple, their vectors are projections of an orthonormal basis.

== Definition ==
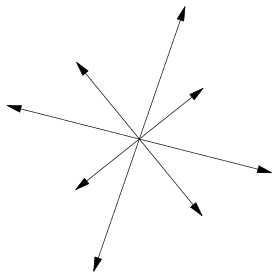
A eutactic star in the plane (n = 2, s = 4)

A star is here defined as a set of 2s vectors A = ±a_{1}, ..., ±a_{s} issuing from a particular origin in a Euclidean space of dimension n ≤ s. A star is eutactic if the a_{i} are the projections onto n dimensions of a set of mutually perpendicular equal vectors b_{1}, ..., b_{s} issuing from a particular origin in Euclidean s-dimensional space. The configuration of 2s vectors in the s-dimensional space B = ±b_{1}, ... , ±b_{s} is known as a cross. Given these definitions, a eutactic star is, concisely, a star produced by the orthogonal projection of a cross.

An equivalent definition, first mentioned by Schläfli, stipulates that a star is eutactic if a constant ζ exists such that

$$\sum_{k=1}^s(\mathbf{a}_k \cdot \mathbf{v})^2 = \zeta |\mathbf{v}|^2$$

for every vector v. The existence of such a constant requires that the sum of the squares of the orthogonal projections of A on a line be equal in all directions. In general,

$$\zeta = \sum_{k=1}^s |\mathbf{a}_k|^2/n.$$

A normalised eutactic star is a projected cross composed of unit vectors. Eutactic stars are often considered in n = 3 dimensions because of their connection with the study of regular polyhedra.

== Hadwiger's principal theorem ==
Let T be the symmetric linear transformation defined for vectors x by

$$T\mathbf{x} = \sum_{k=1}^s \mathbf{a}_k (\mathbf{a}_k\cdot\mathbf{x}),$$

where the a_{j} form any collection of s vectors in the n-dimensional Euclidean space. Hadwiger's principal theorem states that the vectors ±a_{1}, ..., ±a_{s} form a eutactic star if and only if there is a constant ζ such that Tx = ζx for every x. The vectors form a normalized eutactic star precisely when T is the identity operator – when ζ = 1.

Equivalently, the star is normalized eutactic if and only if the matrix A = [a_{1} ... a_{s}], whose columns are the vectors a_{k}, has orthonormal rows. A proof may be given in one direction by completing the rows of this matrix to an orthonormal basis of $\mathbb{R}^s$, and in the other by orthogonally projecting onto the n-dimensional subspace spanned by the first n Cartesian coordinate vectors.

Hadwiger's theorem implies the equivalence of Schläfli's stipulation and the geometrical definition of a eutactic star, by the polarization identity. Furthermore, both Schläfli's identity and Hadwiger's theorem give the same value of the constant ζ.

== Applications ==
Eutactic stars are useful largely because of their relationship with the geometry of polytopes and groups of orthogonal transformations. Schläfli showed early on that the vectors from the center of any regular polytope to its vertices form a eutactic star. Brauer and Coxeter proved the following generalization:

A star is eutactic if it is transformed to itself by some irreducible group of orthogonal transformations that acts transitively on pairs of opposite vectors.

An irreducible group here means a group that does not leave any nontrivial proper subspace invariant (see irreducible representation). Since the set theoretic union of two eutactic stars is itself eutactic (a consequence of Hadwiger's principal theorem), it can be concluded that, in general:

A star is eutactic if it is transformed to itself by some irreducible group of orthogonal transformations.

Eutactic stars may be used to validate the eutaxy of any form in general. According to H. S. M. Coxeter: "A form is eutactic if and only if its minimal vectors are parallel to the vectors of a eutactic star."

== See also ==
- Eutactic lattice
- Tight frame
