= Pedoe's inequality =

Inequality applying to triangles

In geometry, Pedoe's inequality (also Neuberg–Pedoe inequality), named after Daniel Pedoe (1910–1998) and Joseph Jean Baptiste Neuberg (1840–1926), states that if a, b, and c are the lengths of the sides of a triangle with area ƒ, and A, B, and C are the lengths of the sides of another triangle with area F, then

$$A^2(b^2+c^2-a^2)+B^2(a^2+c^2-b^2)+C^2(a^2+b^2-c^2)\geq 16Ff,\,$$

with equality if and only if the two triangles are similar with pairs of corresponding sides (A, a), (B, b), and (C, c).

The expression on the left is not only symmetric under any of the six permutations of the set { (A, a), (B, b), (C, c) } of pairs, but also—perhaps not so obviously—remains the same if a is interchanged with A and b with B and c with C. In other words, it is a symmetric function of the pair of triangles.

Pedoe's inequality is a generalization of Weitzenböck's inequality, which is the case in which one of the triangles is equilateral.

Pedoe discovered the inequality in 1941 and published it subsequently in several articles. Later he learned that the inequality was already known in the 19th century to Neuberg, who however did not prove that the equality implies the similarity of the two triangles.

== Proof ==
By Heron's formula, the area of the two triangles can be expressed as:

$$16f^2=(a+b+c)(a+b-c)(a-b+c)(b+c-a)=(a^2+b^2+c^2)^2-2(a^4+b^4+c^4)$$
$$16F^2=(A+B+C)(A+B-C)(A-B+C)(B+C-A)=(A^2+B^2+C^2)^2-2(A^4+B^4+C^4)$$

and then, using Cauchy-Schwarz inequality we have,

$$16Ff+2a^2A^2+2b^2B^2+2c^2C^2$$
$$\leq \sqrt{16f^2+2a^4+2b^4+2c^4}\sqrt{16F^2+2A^4+2B^4+2C^4}$$
$$= (a^2+b^2+c^2)(A^2+B^2+C^2)$$

So,

$$16Ff\leq  A^2(a^2+b^2+c^2)-2a^2A^2+B^2(a^2+b^2+c^2)-2b^2B^2+C^2(a^2+b^2+c^2)-2c^2C^2$$
$$=A^2(b^2+c^2-a^2)+B^2(a^2+c^2-b^2)+C^2(a^2+b^2-c^2)$$

and the proposition is proven.

Equality holds if and only if $\tfrac{a}{A}=\tfrac{b}{B}=\tfrac{c}{C}=\sqrt{\tfrac{f}{F}}$, that is, the two triangles are similar.

== See also ==
- List of triangle inequalities
