= Eutactic lattice =

Set of points in Euclidean space

In mathematics, a eutactic lattice (or eutactic form) is a lattice in Euclidean space whose minimal vectors form a eutactic star. This means they have a set of positive eutactic coefficients c_{i} such that (v, v) = Σc_{i}(v, m_{i})^{2} where the sum is over the minimal vectors m_{i}. "Eutactic" is derived from the Greek language, and means "well-situated" or "well-arranged".

Voronoi (1908) proved that a lattice is extreme if and only if it is both perfect and eutactic.

Conway & Sloane (1988) summarize the properties of eutactic lattices of dimension up to 7.
