= Forum Geometricorum =

- Discipline: Euclidean geometry
- Language: English
- Edited by: Paul Yiu

Publication details
- History: 2001–2019
- Publisher: Florida Atlantic University
- Open access: Yes

Standard abbreviations
- ISO 4: Forum Geom.

Indexing
- ISSN: 1534-1178
- OCLC no.: 46354245

Links
- Journal homepage; Online access

Forum Geometricorum: A Journal on Classical Euclidean Geometry was a peer-reviewed open-access academic journal that specialized in mathematical research papers on Euclidean geometry.

Founded in 2001, it was published by Florida Atlantic University and was indexed by Mathematical Reviews and Zentralblatt MATH. Its founding editor-in-chief was Paul Yiu, a professor of mathematics at Florida Atlantic.

In 2019, Forum Geometricorum published what was later announced to be its final issue, and stopped accepting submissions, after the retirement of Yiu.

Prior issues are still available. Volumes for 2001 to 2009 can be accessed as a single searchable file (see below). Individual articles up to 2019 are available from Internet Archive (see below).

== See also ==
- International Journal of Geometry
