= Monroe Doctrine =

1823 U.S. foreign policy on the Western Hemisphere

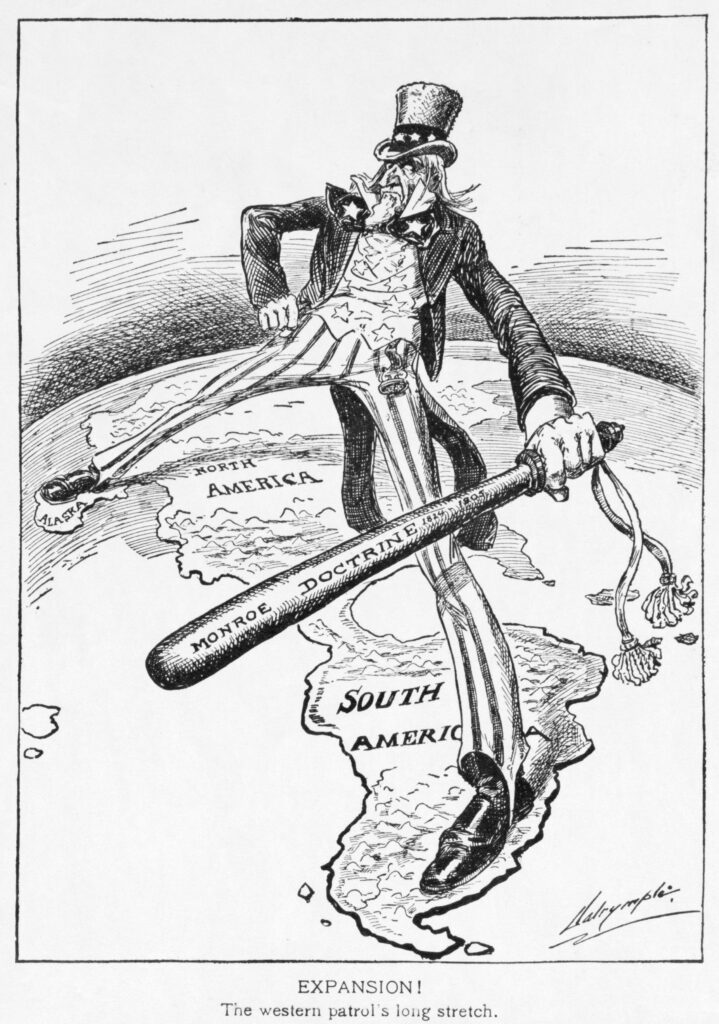
- Political cartoon by Louis Dalrymple about U.S. expansionism; Uncle Sam straddles the Americas while wielding a big stick inscribed with the words "Monroe Doctrine 1824–1905". The stick is a metaphor for military force.
- Date: 1823
- Type: Foreign policy of the United States
- Target: Western Hemisphere
- Organized by: James Monroe

The Monroe Doctrine is a United States foreign policy position that opposes any foreign interference in the Western Hemisphere. Originally concerned with European colonialism, it holds that any intervention in the political affairs of the Americas by foreign powers is a potentially hostile act against the United States. The doctrine was central to American grand strategy in the 20th century.

President James Monroe first articulated the doctrine on December 2, 1823, during his seventh annual State of the Union Address to Congress (though it was not named after him until 1850). At the time, nearly all Spanish colonies in the Americas either had achieved or were close to independence. Monroe asserted that the New World and the Old World were to remain separate spheres of influence, and that further efforts by European powers to control or influence sovereign states in the region would be viewed as a threat to U.S. security. In turn, the United States would recognize and not interfere with existing European colonies nor meddle in the internal affairs of European countries.

Because the U.S. lacked a credible navy and army at the time of the doctrine's proclamation, it was largely ignored by the colonial powers. While it was successfully enforced in part by the United Kingdom, which used it as an opportunity to enforce its own Pax Britannica policy, the doctrine was ignored several times over the course of the 19th century, notably with the second French intervention in Mexico. By the beginning of the 20th century, in what is regarded as a pivotal moment in the history of its foreign policy, the United States itself was able to successfully enforce the doctrine. It has been invoked by many U.S. statesmen and several U.S. presidents, including Ulysses S. Grant, Theodore Roosevelt, John F. Kennedy, Ronald Reagan, and Donald Trump.

After 1898, the Monroe Doctrine was reinterpreted by lawyers and intellectuals as promoting multilateralism and non-intervention. In 1933, under President Franklin D. Roosevelt, the United States affirmed this new interpretation in co-founding the Organization of American States. Into the 21st century, the doctrine continues to be variably denounced, reinstated, or reinterpreted.

== Origins of the Monroe Doctrine ==
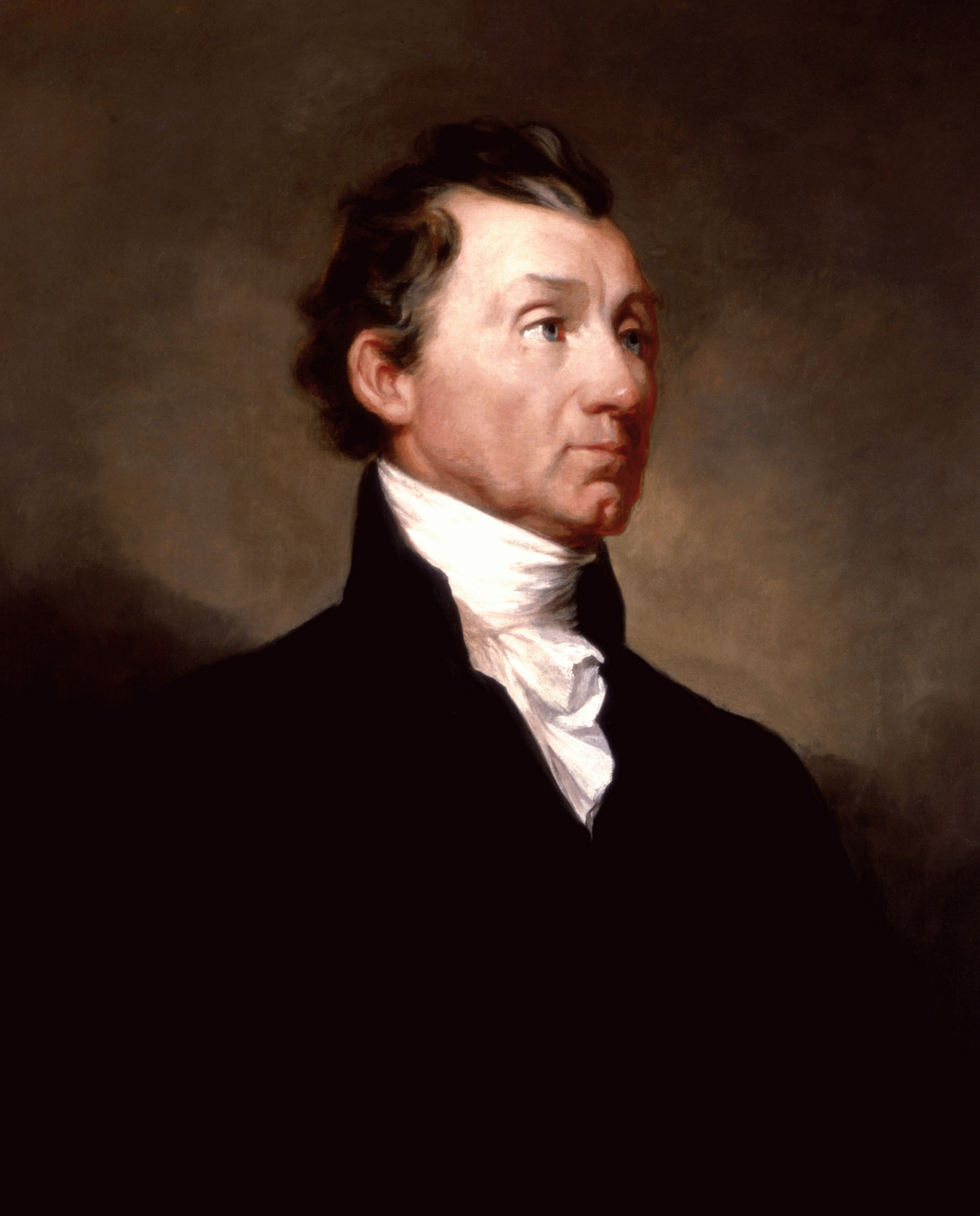
James Monroe, 5th President of the United States

Secretary of State John Quincy Adams, author of the Monroe Doctrine and 6th President of the United States

According to Samuel Eliot Morison, "as early as 1783, then, the United States adopted the policy of isolation and announced its intention to keep out of Europe. The supplementary principle of the Monroe Doctrine, that Europe must keep out of America, was still over the horizon".

Despite the United States' beginnings as an isolationist country, the foundation of the Monroe Doctrine was already being laid almost immediately after the end of the American Revolution. Alexander Hamilton, writing in The Federalist Papers, was already wanting to establish the United States as a world power and hoped that it would suddenly become strong enough to keep the European powers outside of the Americas, despite the fact that the European countries controlled much more of the Americas than the U.S. did itself. Hamilton expected that the United States would become the dominant power in the New World and would, in the future, act as an intermediary between the European powers and any new countries blossoming near the U.S.

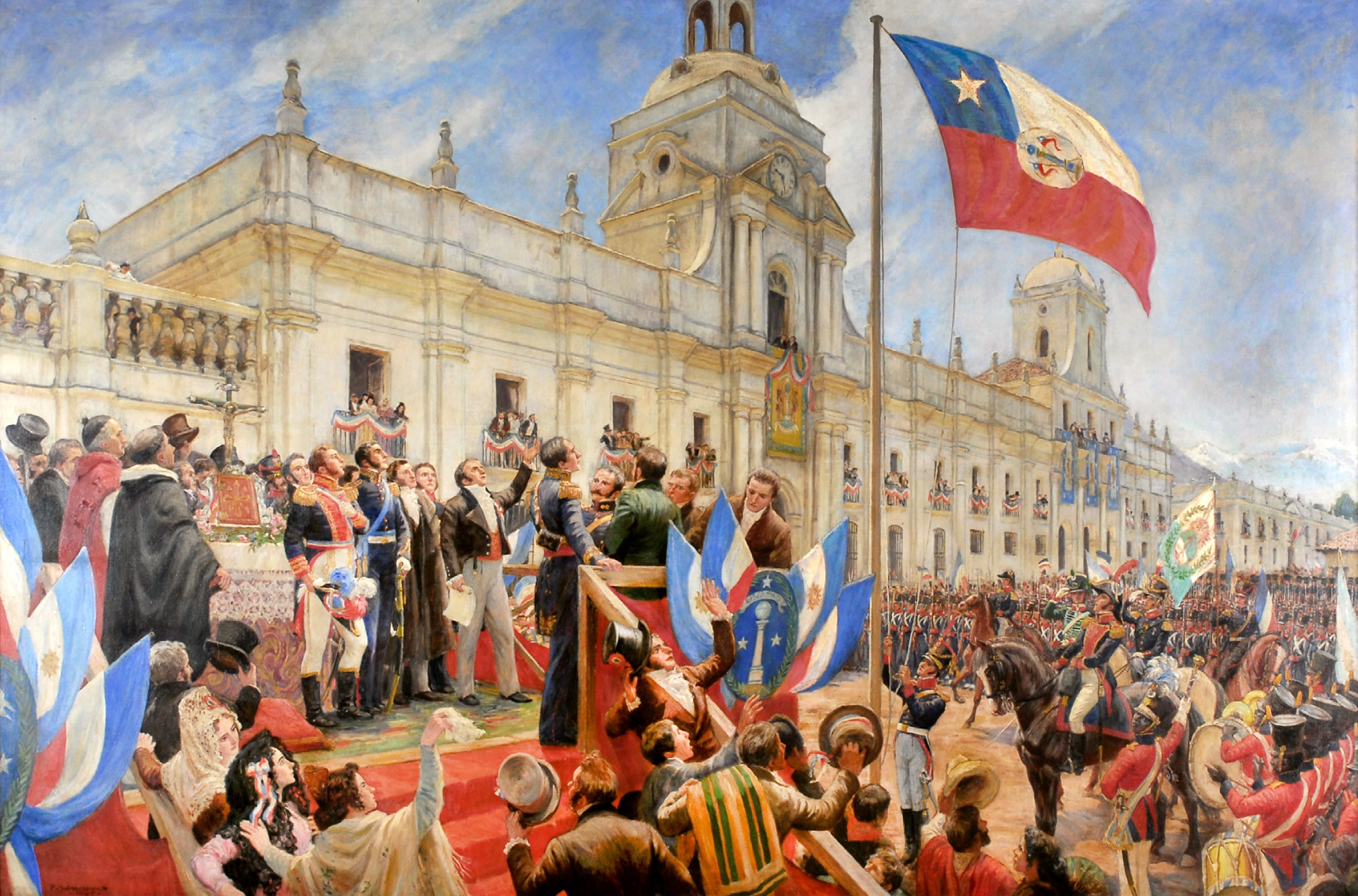
Proclamation of the Chilean Declaration of Independence on February 18, 1818

A note from James Madison (Thomas Jefferson's secretary of state and a future president) to the U.S. ambassador to Spain, expressed the U.S. government's opposition to further territorial acquisition by European powers. Madison's sentiment might have been meaningless because, as was noted before, the European powers held much more territory in comparison to the territory held by the U.S. Although Jefferson was pro-French, in an attempt to keep the U.S. out of any European conflicts, the federal government under Jefferson made it clear to its ambassadors that the U.S. would not support any future colonization efforts on the North American continent.

The U.S. feared the victorious European powers that emerged from the Congress of Vienna (1814–1815) would revive monarchical government. France had already agreed to restore the Spanish monarchy in exchange for Cuba. As the Napoleonic Wars (1803–1815) came to an end, Prussia, Austria, and Russia formed the Holy Alliance to defend monarchism. In particular, the Holy Alliance authorized military incursions to re-establish Bourbon rule over Spain and its colonies, which were establishing their independence.

British foreign policy was compatible with the general objective of the Monroe Doctrine. Britain went as far as covertly assisting the South Americans in their fight against Spain. Britain offered to declare a joint statement concerning the doctrine, as they feared trade with the Americas would be damaged if other European powers further colonized it. In fact, for many years after the doctrine took effect, Britain, through the Royal Navy, was the sole nation enforcing it, as the United States Navy was a comparatively small force. The U.S. government did not issue a joint statement due to the recent War of 1812; however, the immediate provocation was the Russian Ukase of 1821 asserting rights to the Pacific Northwest and forbidding non-Russian ships from approaching the coast.

== Doctrine ==
The full document of the Monroe Doctrine, written chiefly by future president and then secretary of state John Quincy Adams, is long and couched in diplomatic language, but its essence is expressed in two key passages. The first is the introductory statement, which asserts that the New World is no longer subject to colonization by the European countries:

The occasion has been judged proper for asserting, as a principle in which the rights and interests of the United States are involved, that the American continents, by the free and independent condition which they have assumed and maintain, are henceforth not to be considered as subjects for future colonization by any European powers.

The second key passage, which contains a fuller statement of the Doctrine, is addressed to the "allied powers" of Europe; it clarifies that the U.S. remains neutral on existing European colonies in the Americas but is opposed to "interpositions" that would create new colonies among the newly independent Spanish American republics:

We owe it, therefore, to candor and to the amicable relations existing between the United States and those powers to declare that we should consider any attempt on their part to extend their system to any portion of this hemisphere as dangerous to our peace and safety. With the existing colonies or dependencies of any European power, we have not interfered and shall not interfere. But with the Governments who have declared their independence and maintained it, and whose independence we have, on great consideration and on just principles, acknowledged, we could not view any interposition for the purpose of oppressing them, or controlling in any other manner their destiny, by any European power in any other light than as the manifestation of an unfriendly disposition toward the United States.

Monroe's speech did not entail a coherent and comprehensive foreign policy. It was mostly ignored until proponents of the European non-intervention in the Americas tried to craft a cohesive "Monroe doctrine" decades later. It was not until the mid-20th century that the doctrine became a key component of U.S. grand strategy.

== Effects ==
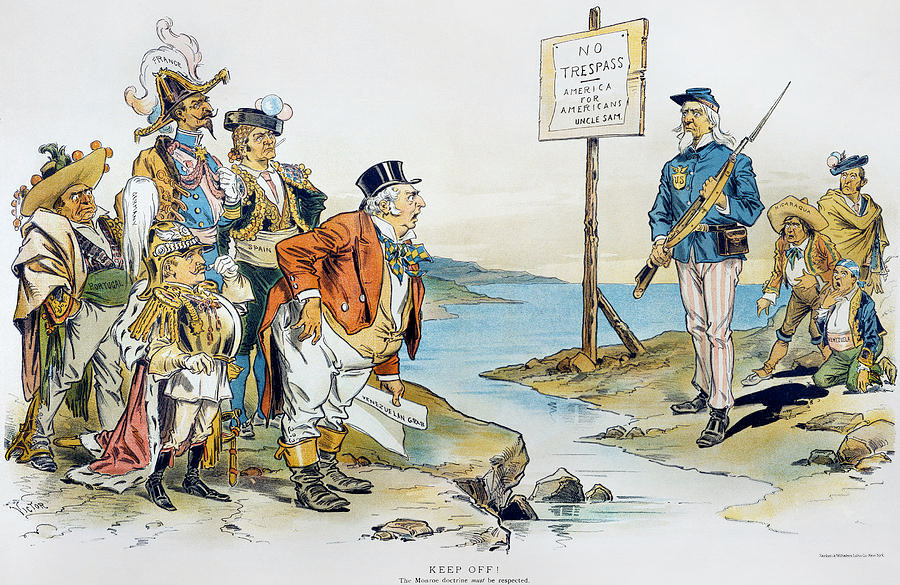
Victor Gillam's 1896 political cartoon depicting Uncle Sam standing with a rifle between the Europeans and Latin Americans

=== International response ===
Because the United States lacked both a credible navy and army at the time, the doctrine was largely disregarded internationally. Prince Klemens von Metternich of Austria was angered by the statement, and wrote privately that the doctrine was a "new act of revolt" by the U.S. that would grant "new strength to the apostles of sedition and reanimate the courage of every conspirator."

The doctrine, however, met with tacit approval from Britain, which enforced it tactically as part of the wider Pax Britannica, which included enforcing the freedom of the seas. This was in line with the developing British policy of supporting laissez-faire free trade and opposing mercantilism. Britain's fast-growing industries sought markets for their manufactured goods, and, if the newly independent Latin American states became Spanish colonies again, British access to these markets would be cut off by Spanish mercantilist policies.

=== Latin American reaction ===
The reaction in Latin America to the Monroe Doctrine was generally favorable but on some occasions suspicious. John A. Crow, author of The Epic of Latin America, states, "Simón Bolívar himself, still in the midst of his last campaign against the Spaniards, Santander in Colombia, Rivadavia in Argentina, Victoria in Mexico—leaders of the emancipation movement everywhere—received Monroe's words with sincerest gratitude". Crow argues that the leaders of Latin America were realists. They knew that the president of the United States wielded very little power at the time, particularly without an alliance with Britain, and figured that the Monroe Doctrine was unenforceable if the U.S. stood alone against the Holy Alliance.

While Latin Americans appreciated and praised their support in the north, they knew that the future of their independence was in the hands of the British and their powerful navy. In 1826, Bolivar called upon his Congress of Panama to host the first "Pan-American" meeting. In the eyes of Bolivar and his men, the Monroe Doctrine was to become nothing more than a tool of national policy. According to Crow, "It was not meant to be, and was never intended to be a charter for concerted hemispheric action". At the same time, some people questioned the intentions behind the Monroe Doctrine. Diego Portales, a Chilean businessman and minister, wrote to a friend: "But we have to be very careful: for the Americans of the north [from the United States], the only Americans are themselves".

In the case of Cuba, which the United States considered to be part of their sphere of influence and even considered annexing at various points in the early nineteenth century, the Monroe Doctrine served to shield the island from possible British inference. Since the British Empire had taken steps towards gradually abolishing slavery, a British takeover would endanger the lucrative slave economy of the island. The Monroe Doctrine sought to ensure the continuation of slavery in Cuba and thus promote American economic interests.

=== Post-Bolívar events ===
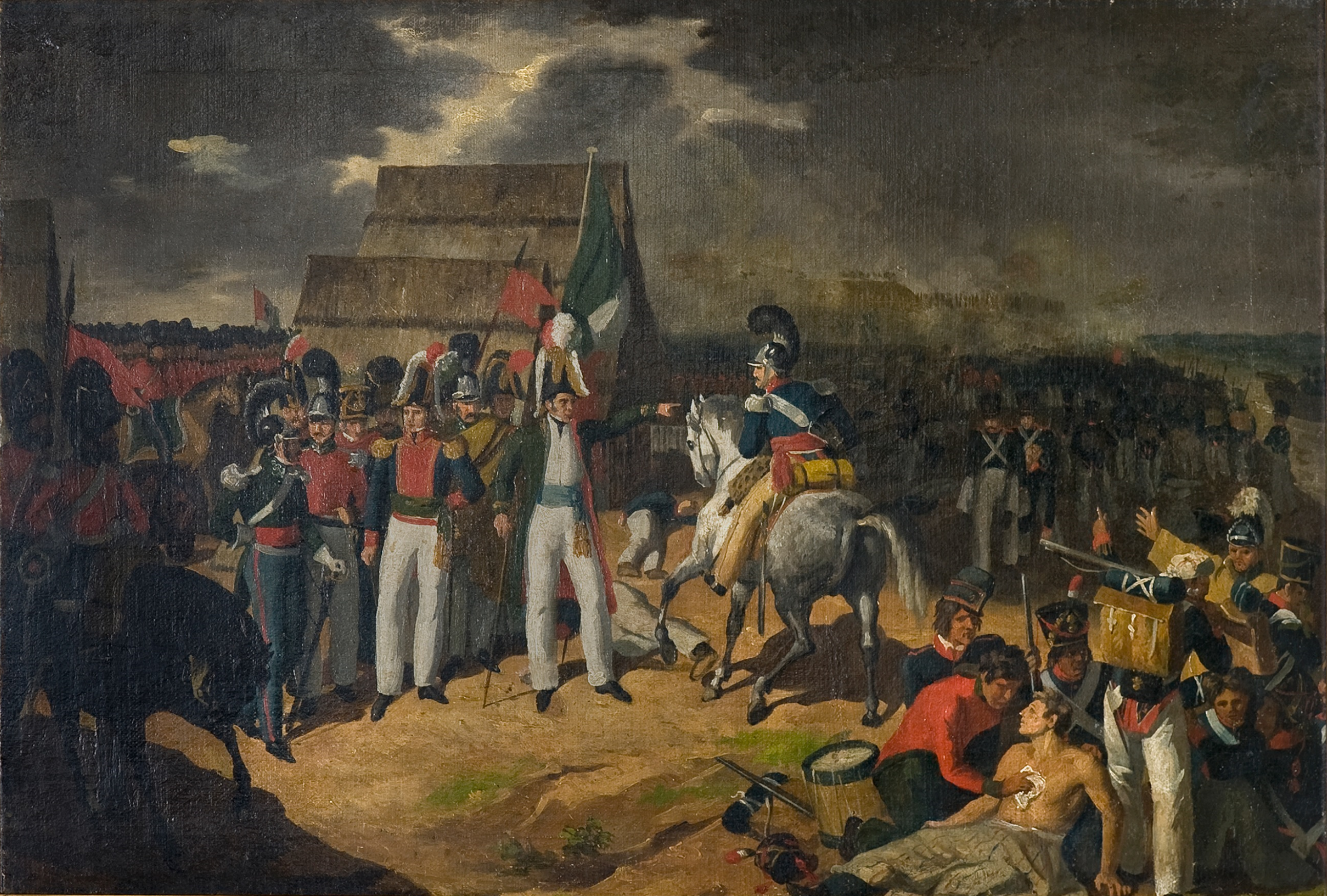
Surrender of the Spanish Army at the Battle of Tampico in 1829

In Spanish America, royalist guerrillas continued the war in several countries, and Spain attempted to retake Mexico in 1829. Only Cuba and Puerto Rico remained under Spanish rule, until the Spanish–American War in 1898.

In early 1833, the British reasserted their sovereignty over the Falkland islands, thus violating the Monroe Doctrine. No action was taken by the U.S. and the historian George C. Herring wrote that inaction "confirmed Latin American and especially Argentine suspicions of the United States." From 1838 to 1850, the Río de la Plata of Argentina was blockaded first by the French navy and then by the British and French navies. As before, no action was undertaken by the U.S. to support Argentina as stipulated in the doctrine.

In 1842, U.S. president John Tyler applied the Monroe Doctrine to the Hawaiian Kingdom and warned Britain not to interfere there. This began the process of annexing Hawaii to the U.S. On December 2, 1845, U.S. president James K. Polk announced that the principle of the Monroe Doctrine should be strictly enforced, reinterpreting it to argue that no European nation should interfere with American western expansion ("manifest destiny").

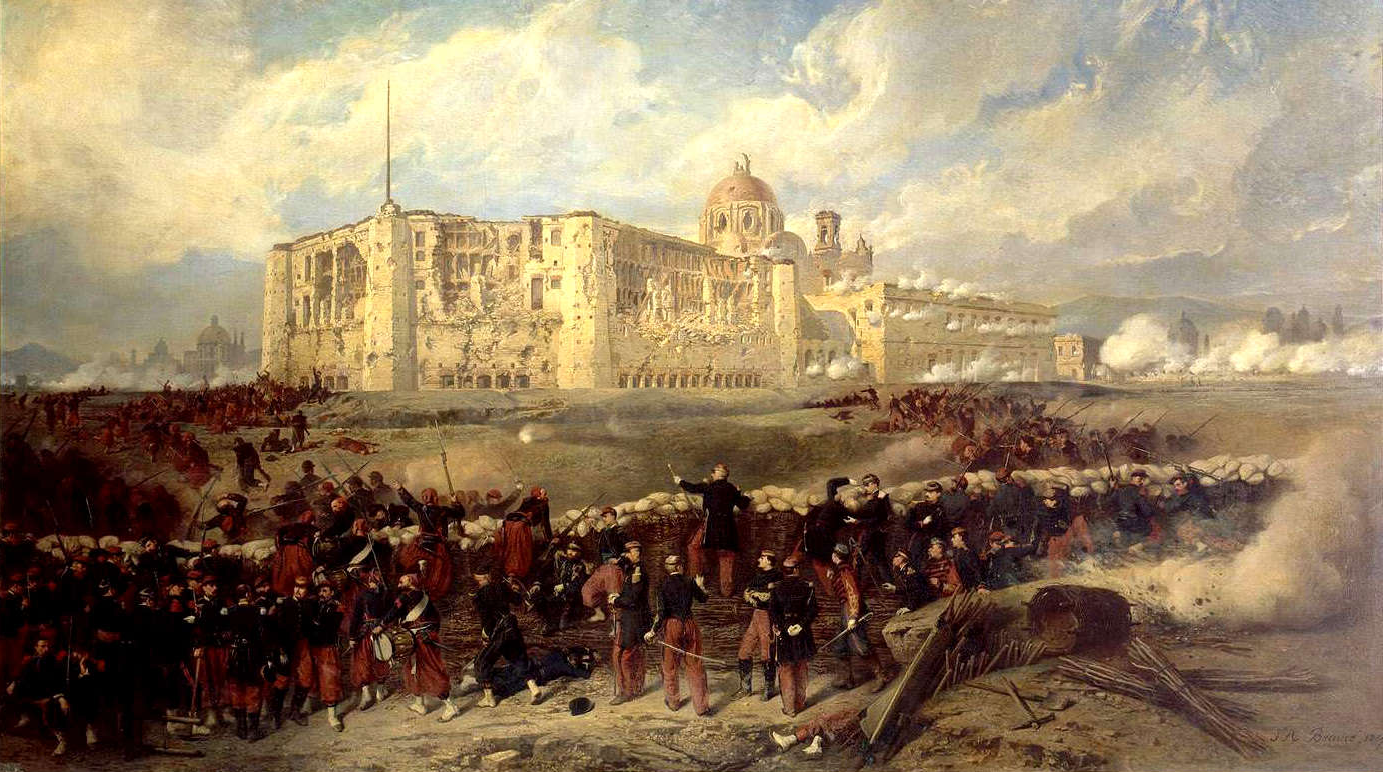
French intervention in Mexico, 1861–1867

In 1861, Dominican military commander and royalist politician Pedro Santana signed a pact with the Spanish Crown and reverted the Dominican nation to colonial status. Spain was wary at first, but with the United States occupied with its own civil war, Spain believed it had an opportunity to reassert control in Latin America. On March 18, 1861, the Spanish annexation of the Dominican Republic was announced. The American Civil War ended in 1865, and following the reassertion of the Monroe Doctrine by the U.S. government, this prompted Spanish forces stationed within the Dominican Republic to extradite back to Cuba within that same year.

In 1862, French forces under Napoleon III invaded and conquered Mexico, giving control to the puppet monarch Maximilian I. Washington denounced this as a violation of the doctrine but was unable to intervene because of the American Civil War. This marked the first time the Monroe Doctrine was widely referred to as a "doctrine". In 1865 the U.S. garrisoned an army on its border to encourage Napoleon III to leave Mexican territory, and they did subsequently remove their forces, which was followed by Mexican nationalists capturing and then executing Maximilian. After the expulsion of France from Mexico, Secretary of State William H. Seward proclaimed in 1868 that the "Monroe doctrine, which eight years ago was merely a theory, is now an irreversible fact."

In 1865, Spain occupied the Chincha Islands in violation of the Monroe Doctrine. In 1862, the remaining British colonies within modern-day Belize were merged into a single crown colony known as British Honduras. The U.S. government did not express disapproval for this action, either during or after the Civil War. In the 1870s, President Ulysses S. Grant and Secretary of State Hamilton Fish endeavored to supplant European influence in Latin America with that of the U.S. In 1870, the Monroe Doctrine was expanded under the proclamation "hereafter no territory on this continent [referring to Central and South America] shall be regarded as subject to transfer to a European power." Grant invoked the Monroe Doctrine in his failed attempt to annex the Dominican Republic in 1870.

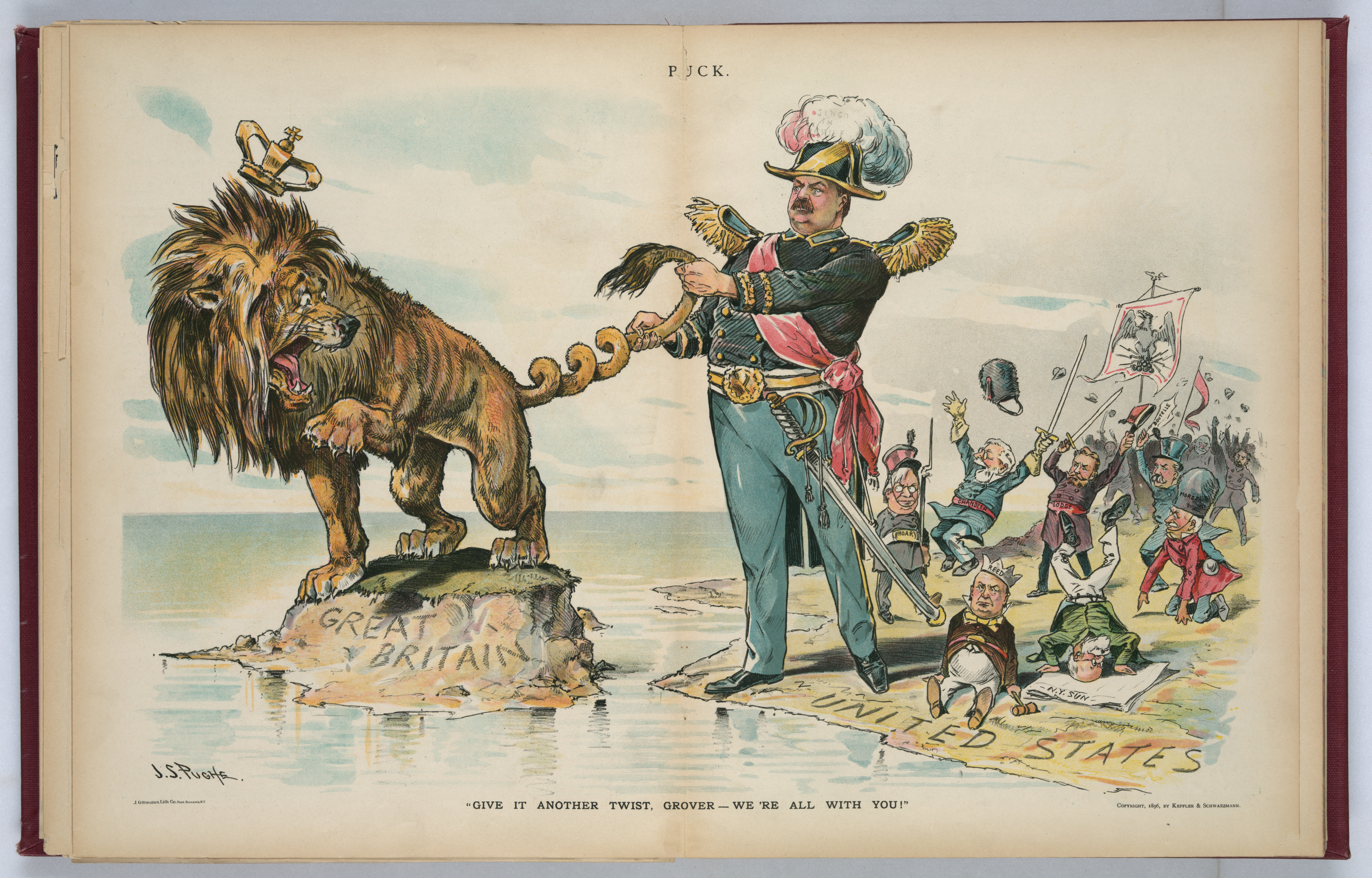
President Grover Cleveland twisting the tail of the British Lion; cartoon in Puck by J. S. Pughe, 1895

The Venezuelan crisis of 1895 became "one of the most momentous episodes in the history of Anglo-American relations in general and of Anglo-American rivalries in Latin America in particular." Venezuela sought to involve the U.S. in a territorial dispute with Britain and hired former U.S. ambassador William Lindsay Scruggs to argue that Britain's actions over the issue violated the Monroe Doctrine. President Grover Cleveland, through Secretary of State Richard Olney, cited the doctrine in 1895, threatening strong action against Britain if the British failed to arbitrate their dispute with Venezuela. In a July 20, 1895, note to Britain, Olney stated, "The United States is practically sovereign on this continent, and its fiat is law upon the subjects to which it confines its interposition."

British prime minister Lord Salisbury took strong exception to the American language. The U.S. subsequently objected to a British proposal for a joint meeting to clarify the scope of the Monroe Doctrine. Herring wrote that by failing to pursue the issue further, the British "tacitly conceded the U.S. definition of the Monroe Doctrine and its hegemony in the hemisphere." German chancellor Otto von Bismarck did not agree and in October 1897 called the doctrine an "uncommon insolence". Sitting in Paris, the Tribunal of Arbitration finalized its decision on October 3, 1899. The award was unanimous, but gave no reasons for the decision, merely describing the resulting boundary, which gave Britain almost 90% of the disputed territory and all of the gold mines.

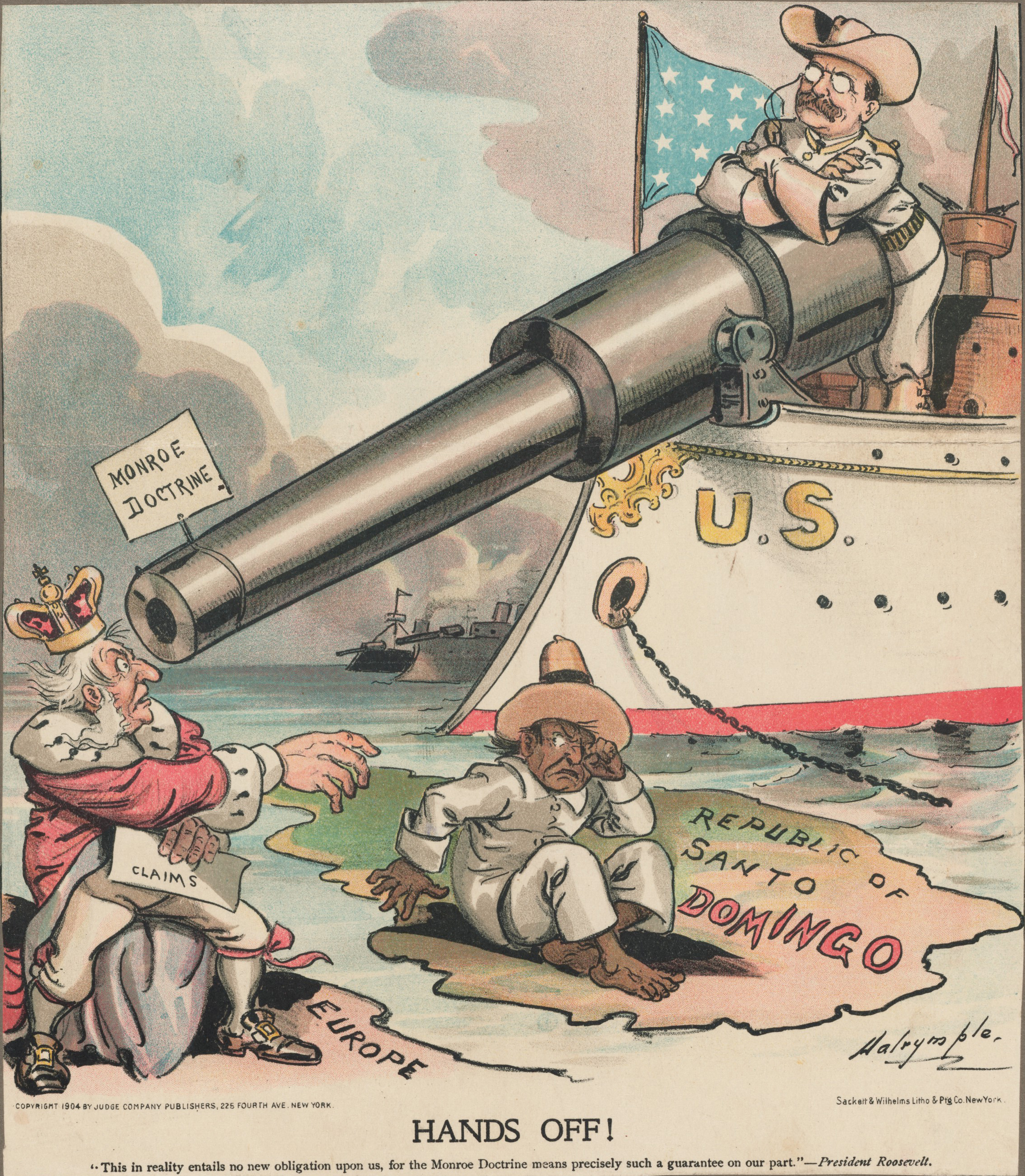
Political cartoon depicting Theodore Roosevelt using the Monroe Doctrine to keep European powers out of the Dominican Republic

The reaction to the award was of surprise, with the award's lack of reasoning a particular concern. The Venezuelans were keenly disappointed with the outcome, though they honored their counsel for their efforts (their delegation's secretary, Severo Mallet-Prevost, received the Order of the Liberator in 1944), and abided by the award. The boundary dispute asserted for the first time a more outward-looking U.S. foreign policy, particularly in the Americas, marking the United States as a world power. This was the earliest example of modern interventionism under the Monroe Doctrine in which the U.S. exercised its claimed prerogatives in the Americas.

In 1898, the U.S. intervened in support of Cuba during its war for independence from Spain. The resulting Spanish–American War ended in a peace treaty requiring Spain to cede Puerto Rico, the Philippines, and Guam to the U.S. in exchange for $20 million. Spain was additionally forced to recognize Cuban independence, though the island remained under U.S. occupation until 1902.

=== Big Brother ===
The "Big Brother" policy was an extension of the Monroe Doctrine formulated by James G. Blaine in the 1880s that aimed to rally Latin American nations behind U.S. leadership and open their markets to U.S. traders. Blaine served as Secretary of State in 1881 under President James A. Garfield and again from 1889 to 1892 under President Benjamin Harrison. As a part of the policy, Blaine arranged and led the First International Conference of American States in 1889.

=== Olney Corollary ===
The Olney Corollary, also known as the Olney interpretation or Olney declaration, was U.S. secretary of state Richard Olney's interpretation of the Monroe Doctrine when the border dispute for the Essequibo occurred between the British and Venezuelan governments in 1895. Olney claimed that the Monroe Doctrine gave the U.S. authority to mediate border disputes in the Western Hemisphere. Olney extended the meaning of the Monroe Doctrine, which had previously stated merely that the Western Hemisphere was closed to additional European colonization. The statement reinforced the original purpose of the Monroe Doctrine, that the U.S. had the right to intervene in its own hemisphere and foreshadowed the events of the Spanish–American War three years later. The Olney interpretation was defunct by 1933.

=== Canada ===
In 1902, Canadian prime minister Wilfrid Laurier acknowledged that the Monroe Doctrine was essential to his country's protection. The doctrine provided Canada with a de facto security guarantee by the United States; the U.S. Navy in the Pacific, and the Royal Navy in the Atlantic, made invading North America almost impossible. Because of the peaceful relations between the two countries, Canada could assist Britain in a European war without having to defend itself at home.

=== Roosevelt Corollary ===
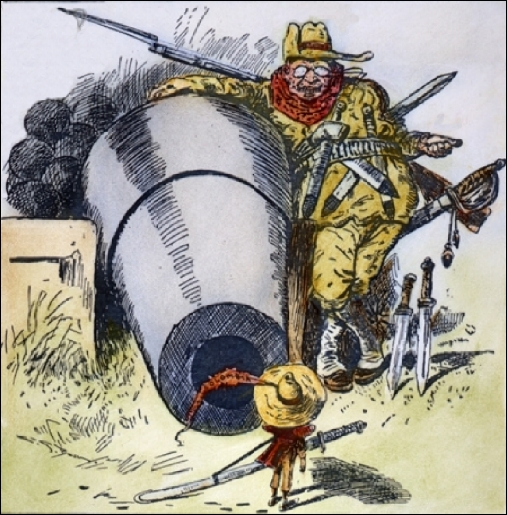
1903 cartoon: "Go Away, Little Man, and Don't Bother Me". President Theodore Roosevelt intimidating Colombia to acquire the Panama Canal Zone.

The doctrine has subsequently been reinterpreted and applied in a variety of instances. As the U.S. began to emerge as a world power, the Monroe Doctrine came to define a recognized sphere of influence that few dared to challenge.

Before becoming president, Theodore Roosevelt had proclaimed the rationale of the Monroe Doctrine in supporting intervention in the Spanish colony of Cuba in 1898. The Venezuela crisis of 1902–1903 showed the world that the U.S. was willing to use its naval strength to intervene to stabilize the economic affairs of small states in the Caribbean and Central America if they were unable to pay their international debts, in order to preclude European intervention to do so. The Venezuela crisis, and in particular the arbitral award, were key in the development of the Corollary.

In Argentine foreign policy, the Drago Doctrine was announced on December 29, 1902, by Argentine foreign minister Luis María Drago. The doctrine itself was a response to the actions of Britain, Germany, and Italy, which, in 1902, had blockaded Venezuela in response to the Venezuelan government's refusal to pay its massive foreign debt that had been acquired under previous administrations before President Cipriano Castro took power. Drago set forth the policy that no European power could use force against an American nation to collect debt owed. Roosevelt rejected this policy as an extension of the Monroe Doctrine, declaring, "We do not guarantee any state against punishment if it misconducts itself".

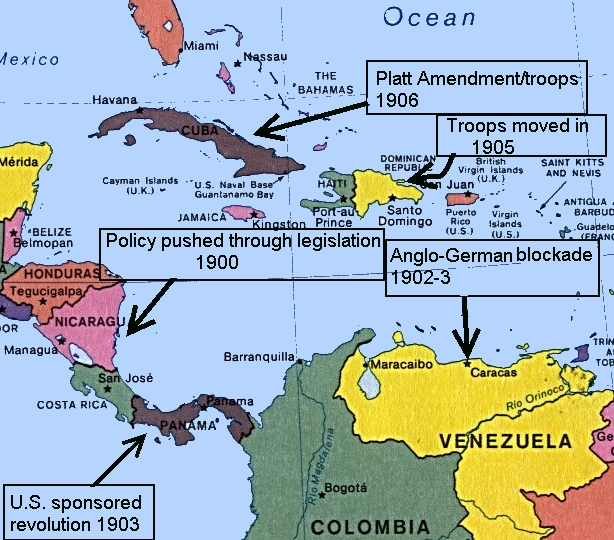
A map of Middle America showing the places affected by Theodore Roosevelt's Big stick policy

Instead, Roosevelt added the Roosevelt Corollary to the Monroe Doctrine in 1904, asserting the right of the U.S. to intervene in Latin America in cases of "flagrant and chronic wrongdoing by a Latin American Nation" to preempt intervention by European creditors. This reinterpretation of the Monroe Doctrine went on to be a useful tool to take economic benefits by force when Latin American nations failed to pay their debts to European and U.S. banks and business interests. This was also referred to as the big stick ideology because of the oft-quoted phrase from Roosevelt, "speak softly and carry a big stick". The Roosevelt Corollary provoked outrage across Latin America.

The corollary was invoked to intervene militarily in Latin America to stop the spread of European influence. It was the most significant amendment to the original doctrine and was widely opposed by critics, who argued that the Monroe Doctrine was originally meant to stop European influence in the Americas. Christopher Coyne has argued that the addition of the Corollary to the Monroe Doctrine began the second phase of "American Liberal Empire" and "can be understood as a foreign policy declaration based on military primacy." It initiated a tectonic shift in the political and economic relations between the United States and Latin America, and with European governments. Other critics have argued that the Corollary asserted U.S. domination in the area, effectively making them a "hemispheric policeman".

The early decades of the 20th century saw a number of interventions in Latin America by the U.S. government often justified under the Roosevelt Corollary to the Monroe Doctrine. President William Howard Taft viewed dollar diplomacy as a way for American corporations to benefit while assisting in the national security goal of preventing European powers from filling any possible financial power vacuum.

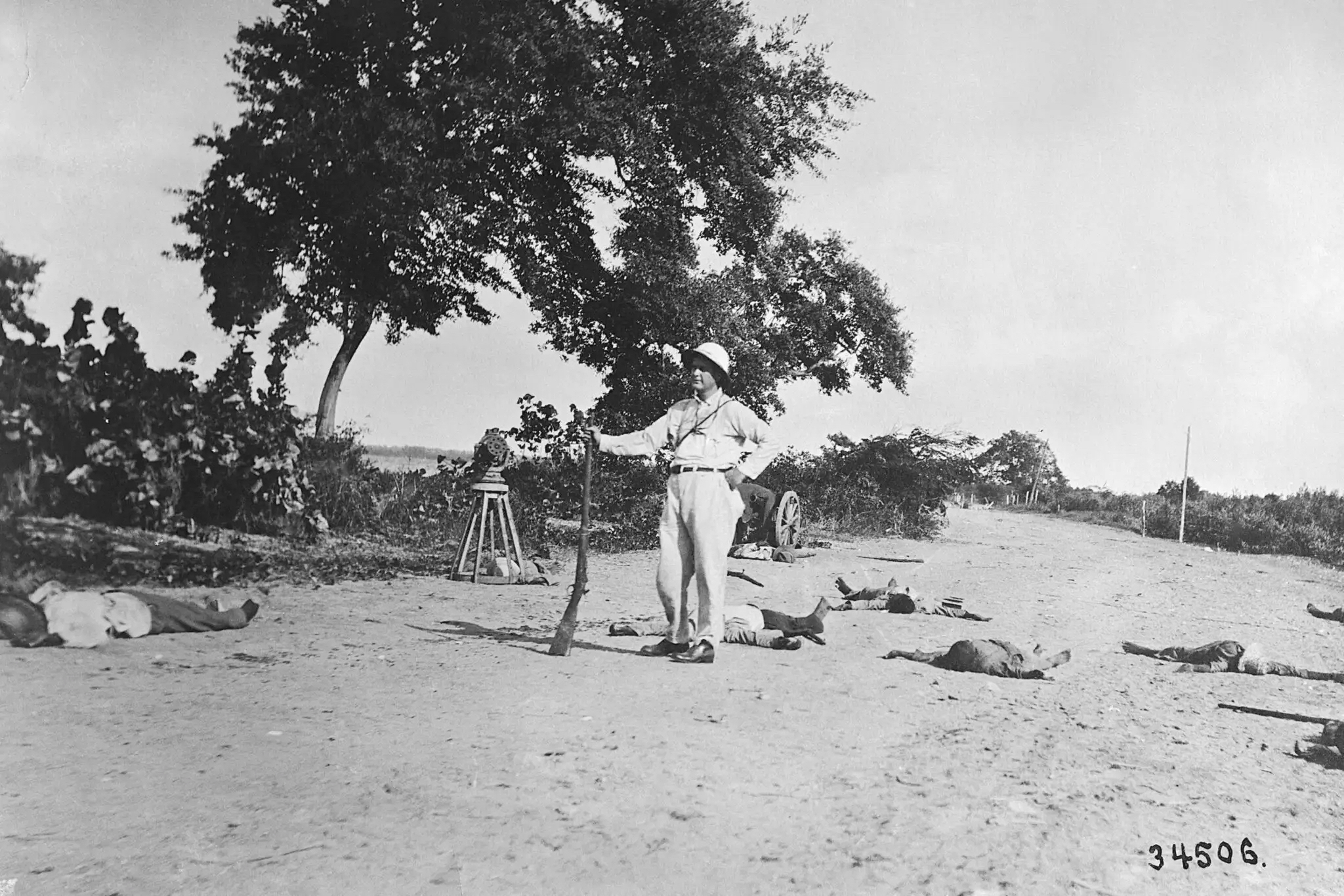
U.S. Marine posing with dead Haitian revolutionaries during the United States occupation of Haiti

The United States launched multiple interventions into Latin America, resulting in U.S. military presence in Cuba, Honduras, Panama (via the Hay–Bunau-Varilla Treaty and Isthmian Canal Commission), Haiti (1915–1935), the Dominican Republic (1916–1924) and Nicaragua (1912–1925 and 1926–1933). U.S. marines began to specialize in long-term military occupation of these countries, primarily to safeguard customs revenues which were the cause of local civil wars.

The Platt Amendment amended a treaty between the U.S. and the Republic of Cuba after the Spanish–American War, virtually making Cuba a U.S. protectorate. The amendment outlined conditions for the U.S. to intervene in Cuban affairs and permitted the United States to lease or buy lands for the purpose of establishing naval bases, including Guantánamo Bay.

=== Lodge Corollary ===
The so-called "Lodge Corollary" was passed by the U.S. Senate on August 2, 1912, in response to a reported attempt by a Japan-backed private company to acquire Magdalena Bay in Baja California Sur. It extended the reach of the Monroe Doctrine to cover actions of corporations and associations controlled by foreign states.

=== Clark Memorandum ===
The Clark Memorandum, written on December 17, 1928, by President Calvin Coolidge's undersecretary of state J. Reuben Clark, concerned American use of military force to intervene in Latin American nations. This memorandum was officially released in 1930 by the administration of President Herbert Hoover.

The Clark Memorandum rejected the view that the Roosevelt Corollary was based on the Monroe Doctrine. However, it was not a complete repudiation of the Roosevelt Corollary but was rather a statement that any intervention by the U.S. was not sanctioned by the Monroe Doctrine but rather was the right of the U.S. as a state. One section emphasizes "The Monroe Doctrine not inimical to establishment of monarchial government in the western hemisphere." This separated the Roosevelt Corollary from the Monroe Doctrine by noting that the doctrine only applied to situations involving European countries. One main point in the Clark Memorandum was to note that the Monroe Doctrine was based on conflicts of interest only between the United States and European nations, rather than between the U.S. and Latin American nations.

At the time of official release, Clark wrote to Henry Stimson:

Furthermore, the fact should never be lost to view that in applying this Doctrine during the period of one hundred years since it was announced, our Government has over and over again driven it in as a shield between Europe and the Americas to protect Latin America from the political and territorial thrusts of Europe; and this was done at times when the American nations were weak and struggling for the establishment of stable, permanent governments; when the political morality of Europe sanctioned, indeed encouraged, the acquisition of territory by force; and when many of the great powers of Europe looked with eager, covetous eyes to the rich, undeveloped areas of the American hemisphere. Nor should another equally vital fact be lost sight of, that the United States has only been able to give this protection against designing European powers because of its known willingness and determination, if and whenever necessary, to expend its treasure and to sacrifice American life to maintain the principles of the Doctrine. So far as Latin America is concerned, the Doctrine is now, and always has been, not an instrument of violence and oppression, but an unbought, freely bestowed, and wholly effective guaranty of their freedom, independence, and territorial integrity against the imperialistic designs of Europe.

=== World War II ===
American servicemen in Greenland during World War II

After World War II began, a majority of Americans supported defending the entire Western Hemisphere against foreign invasion. A 1940 national survey found that 81% supported defending Canada; 75% Mexico and Central America; 69% South America; 66% West Indies; and 59% Greenland.

The December 1941 conquest of Saint Pierre and Miquelon by Free French forces from the control of Vichy France was seen as a violation of the Monroe Doctrine by Secretary of State Cordell Hull.

During World War II, the US invoked its Monroe Doctrine and occupied Greenland to prevent use by Germany following the German occupation of Denmark. The US military remained in Greenland after the war, and by 1948, Denmark abandoned attempts to persuade the US to leave. The following year, both countries became members of the NATO military alliance. A 1951 treaty gave the US a significant role in Greenland's defense. As of 2025, the US Space Force maintains Pituffik Space Base in Greenland, and the US military frequently takes part in NATO exercises in Greenlandic waters.

=== Latin American reinterpretation ===
After 1898, jurists and intellectuals in Argentina, Brazil, Chile, and Uruguay, especially Luis María Drago, Alejandro Álvarez, and Baltasar Brum, reinterpreted the Monroe Doctrine. They sought a fresh continental approach to international law in terms of multilateralism and non-intervention. Indeed, an alternative Spanish American origin of the idea was proposed, attributing it to Manuel Torres. However, U.S. officials were reluctant to renounce unilateral interventionism until the Good Neighbor policy enunciated by President Franklin D. Roosevelt in 1933. The era of the Good Neighbor Policy ended with the ramp-up of the Cold War in 1945, as the United States felt there was a greater need to protect the western hemisphere from Soviet influence. These changes conflicted with the Good Neighbor Policy's fundamental principle of non-intervention and led to a new wave of U.S. involvement in Latin American affairs. Control of the Monroe doctrine thus shifted to the multilateral Organization of American States (OAS) founded in 1948.

In 1954, Secretary of State John Foster Dulles invoked the Monroe Doctrine at the 10th Pan-American Conference in Caracas, denouncing the intervention of Soviet communism in Guatemala. President John F. Kennedy said at an August 29, 1962, news conference:

The Monroe Doctrine means what it has meant since President Monroe and John Quincy Adams enunciated it, and that is that we would oppose a foreign power extending its power to the Western Hemisphere, and that is why we oppose what is happening in Cuba today. That is why we have cut off our trade. That is why we worked in the OAS and in other ways to isolate the Communist menace in Cuba. That is why we will continue to give a good deal of our effort and attention to it.

=== Cold War ===
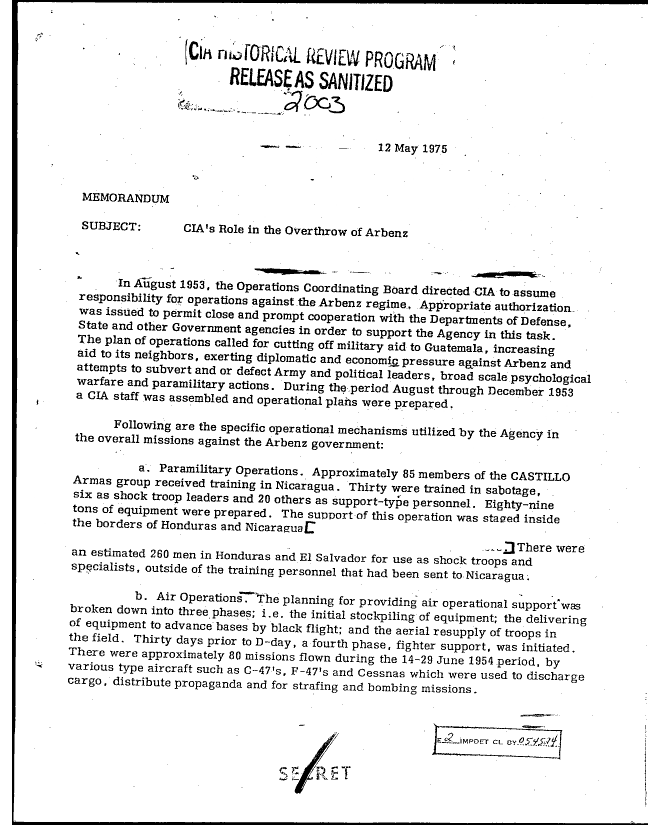
A CIA memorandum dated May 1975 which describes the role of the Agency in deposing the Guatemalan government of President Jacobo Árbenz in June 1954 (1–5)

During the Cold War, the Monroe Doctrine was applied to Latin America by the framers of U.S. foreign policy. When the Cuban Revolution (1953–1959) established a communist government with ties to the Soviet Union, it was argued that the Monroe Doctrine should be invoked to prevent the spread of Soviet-backed communism in Latin America. Under this rationale, the U.S. provided intelligence and military aid to Latin and South American governments that claimed or appeared to be threatened by communist subversion (as in the case of Operation Condor).

During the Cuban Missile Crisis in 1962, Kennedy cited the Monroe Doctrine as grounds for the United States' confrontation with the Soviet Union over the installation of Soviet ballistic missiles on Cuban soil.

The debate over this new interpretation of the Monroe Doctrine burgeoned in reaction to the Iran–Contra affair. It was revealed that the U.S. Central Intelligence Agency had been covertly training "Contra" guerrilla soldiers in Honduras in an attempt to destabilize and overthrow the Sandinista revolutionary government of Nicaragua and its president, Daniel Ortega. CIA director Robert Gates vigorously defended the Contra operation in 1984, arguing that eschewing U.S. intervention in Nicaragua would be "totally to abandon the Monroe Doctrine".

=== 21st-century approaches ===
==== Kerry Doctrine ====
Secretary of State John Kerry told the Organization of American States in November 2013 that the "era of the Monroe Doctrine is over." Several commentators have noted that Kerry's call for a mutual partnership with other countries in the Americas is more in keeping with the intentions of the policy's namesake than the policies that were enacted after Monroe's death.

==== America First and Trump Corollary: The "Donroe Doctrine" ====
President Donald Trump implied potential use of the doctrine in August 2017 when he mentioned the possibility of military intervention in Venezuela, after CIA director Mike Pompeo declared that the nation's deterioration was the result of interference from Iranian- and Russian-backed groups. In February 2018, Secretary of State Rex Tillerson praised the Monroe Doctrine as "clearly… a success", warning of "imperial" Chinese trade ambitions and touting the United States as the region's preferred trade partner. Pompeo replaced Tillerson as Secretary of State in May 2018. Trump reiterated his commitment to the implementation of the Monroe Doctrine at the 73rd UN General Assembly in 2018. Russian permanent representative to the United Nations Vasily Nebenzya criticized the U.S. for what Russia perceived as an implementation of the Monroe Doctrine at the 8,452nd emergency meeting of the UN Security Council on January 26, 2019. Venezuela's representative listed 27 interventions in Latin America that Venezuela considers to be implementations of the Monroe Doctrine and stated that, in the context of the statements, they considered it "a direct military threat to the Bolivarian Republic of Venezuela". Cuba's representative formulated a similar opinion, "The current Administration of the United States of America has declared the Monroe Doctrine to be in effect..."

On March 3, 2019, National Security Advisor John Bolton invoked the Monroe Doctrine in describing the Trump administration's policy in the Americas, saying "In this administration, we're not afraid to use the word Monroe Doctrine...It's been the objective of US presidents going back to President Ronald Reagan to have a completely democratic hemisphere."

Trump's determination to treat the Western Hemisphere as a U.S. sphere of influence has been characterized as a revival of the Monroe Doctrine. The final draft of the 2025 National Security Strategy called upon the United States to "reassert and enforce the Monroe Doctrine to restore American [i.e., U.S.] pre-eminence in the Western Hemisphere." That same document announces the "Trump Corollary" to the Monroe Doctrine. Foreign policy experts described the move as a desire to divide the world into "spheres of influence" between the United States, Russia, and China, and American officials later explained the strategy in those terms. Trump's large-scale naval deployment and military strikes against alleged drug boats in the Caribbean were described by experts speaking to Reuters and the BBC as examples of gunboat diplomacy. The designation of drug cartels as terrorist organizations and Trump's promise of land-based military strikes were described as providing a legal rationale for possible military action and regime change in Venezuela. In 2025, The New York Times noted that "top [Donald Trump] administration officials have been explicit that their overarching goal is to assert American dominance over its half of the planet." Following the capture of Venezuelan President Nicolás Maduro in a January 2026 raid, Trump claimed that the action was an application of the Monroe Doctrine, stylizing it as the "Donroe Doctrine" and telling reporters that "American dominance in the Western Hemisphere will never be questioned again".

== Criticism ==
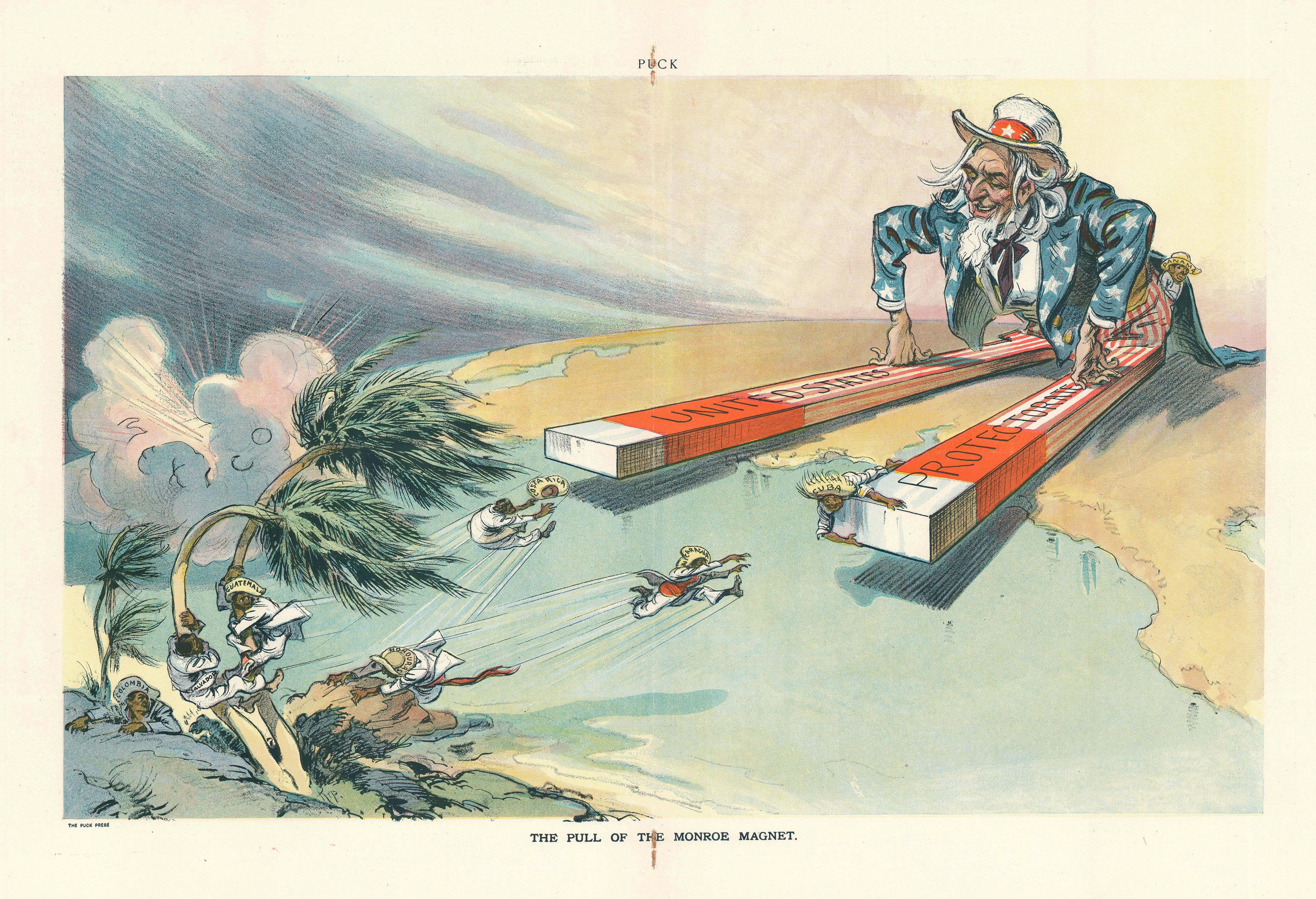
The Pull of the Monroe Magnet highlights the interventionist and paternalistic practices of the United States in Latin America; cartoon in Puck by Udo Keppler, 1913

Historians have observed that while the doctrine contained a commitment to resist further European colonialism in the Americas, it resulted in some aggressive implications for U.S. foreign policy, since there were no limitations on its own actions mentioned within it. Historian Jay Sexton notes that the tactics used to implement the doctrine were modeled after those employed by European imperial powers during the 17th and 18th centuries. American historian William Appleman Williams, seeing the doctrine as a form of American imperialism, described it as a form of "imperial anti-colonialism". Noam Chomsky argues that in practice the Monroe Doctrine has been used by the U.S. government as a declaration of hegemony and a right of unilateral intervention over the Americas.

== Use in Australia ==
Australia's foreign policy position of opposing threatening powers in the Pacific islands in the early 1900s has been described by Otto von Bismarck, Alfred Deakin, Billy Hughes, and several historians as the "Australasian Monroe Doctrine", "Australian Monroe Doctrine", or the "Pacific Monroe Doctrine".

The term has been revived by commentators in the 2020s, following Australia's shift to the Pacific due to perceived influence from China.

== See also ==
- America's Backyard – Political and international relations concept
- Banana Wars – Series of conflicts in Central America and the Caribbean
- Brezhnev Doctrine – Foreign policy justifying intervention in the Soviet Bloc
- Foreign policy of the United States
- Gunboat diplomacy – Pursuit of foreign policy objectives with the aid of conspicuous displays of naval power
- History of Latin America–United States relations
- Foreign interventions by the United States
- Monroe Doctrine Centennial half dollar – US commemorative fifty-cent piece (1923)
- List of United States invasions of Latin American countries
- United States involvement in regime change in Latin America
