= List of inequalities =

This article lists Wikipedia articles about named mathematical inequalities.

== Inequalities in pure mathematics ==
=== Analysis ===
- Agmon's inequality
- Askey–Gasper inequality
- Babenko–Beckner inequality
- Bernoulli's inequality
- Bernstein's inequality (mathematical analysis)
- Bessel's inequality
- Bihari–LaSalle inequality
- Bohnenblust–Hille inequality
- Borell–Brascamp–Lieb inequality
- Brezis–Gallouet inequality
- Carleman's inequality
- Carlson's inequality
- Chebyshev–Markov–Stieltjes inequalities
- Chebyshev's sum inequality
- Clarkson's inequalities
- Eilenberg's inequality
- Fekete–Szegő inequality
- Fenchel's inequality
- Friedrichs' inequality
- Gagliardo–Nirenberg interpolation inequality
- Gårding's inequality
- Grothendieck inequality
- Grunsky's inequalities
- Hanner's inequalities
- Hardy's inequality
- Hardy–Littlewood inequality
- Hardy–Littlewood–Sobolev inequality
- Harnack's inequality
- Hausdorff–Young inequality
- Hermite–Hadamard inequality
- Hilbert's inequality
- Hölder's inequality
- Jackson's inequality
- Jensen's inequality
- Khabibullin's conjecture on integral inequalities
- Kantorovich inequality
- Karamata's inequality
- Korn's inequality
- Ladyzhenskaya's inequality
- Landau–Kolmogorov inequality
- Lebedev–Milin inequality
- Lieb–Thirring inequality
- Littlewood's 4/3 inequality
- Markov brothers' inequality
- Mashreghi–Ransford inequality
- Max–min inequality
- Minkowski's inequality
- Poincaré inequality
- Popoviciu's inequality
- Prékopa–Leindler inequality
- Rayleigh–Faber–Krahn inequality
- Remez inequality
- Riesz rearrangement inequality
- Schur test
- Shapiro inequality
- Sobolev inequality
- Steffensen's inequality
- Szegő inequality
- Three spheres inequality
- Trace inequalities
- Trudinger's theorem
- Turán's inequalities
- Von Neumann's inequality
- Wirtinger's inequality for functions
- Young's convolution inequality
- Young's inequality for products

==== Inequalities relating to means ====
- Hardy–Littlewood maximal inequality
- Inequality of arithmetic and geometric means
- Ky Fan inequality
- Levinson's inequality
- Maclaurin's inequality
- Mahler's inequality
- Muirhead's inequality
- Newton's inequalities
- Stein–Strömberg theorem

=== Combinatorics ===
- Binomial coefficient bounds
- Factorial bounds
- XYZ inequality
- Fisher's inequality
- Ingleton's inequality
- Lubell–Yamamoto–Meshalkin inequality
- Nesbitt's inequality
- Rearrangement inequality
- Schur's inequality
- Shapiro inequality
- Stirling's formula (bounds)

=== Differential equations ===
- Grönwall's inequality

=== Geometry ===
- Alexandrov–Fenchel inequality
- Aristarchus's inequality
- Barrow's inequality
- Berger–Kazdan comparison theorem
- Blaschke–Lebesgue inequality
- Blaschke–Santaló inequality
- Bishop–Gromov inequality
- Bogomolov–Miyaoka–Yau inequality
- Bonnesen's inequality
- Brascamp–Lieb inequality
- Brunn–Minkowski inequality
- Castelnuovo–Severi inequality
- Cheng's eigenvalue comparison theorem
- Clifford's theorem on special divisors
- Cohn-Vossen's inequality
- Erdős–Mordell inequality
- Euler's theorem in geometry
- Gromov's inequality for complex projective space
- Gromov's systolic inequality for essential manifolds
- Hadamard's inequality
- Hadwiger–Finsler inequality
- Hinge theorem
- Hitchin–Thorpe inequality
- Isoperimetric inequality
- Jordan's inequality
- Jung's theorem
- Loewner's torus inequality
- Łojasiewicz inequality
- Loomis–Whitney inequality
- Melchior's inequality
- Milman's reverse Brunn–Minkowski inequality
- Milnor–Wood inequality
- Minkowski's first inequality for convex bodies
- Myers's theorem
- Noether inequality
- Ono's inequality
- Pedoe's inequality
- Ptolemy's inequality
- Pu's inequality
- Riemannian Penrose inequality
- Toponogov's theorem
- Triangle inequality
- Tupper's self-referential formula
- Weitzenböck's inequality
- Wirtinger inequality (2-forms)

=== Information theory ===
- Inequalities in information theory
- Kraft's inequality
- Log sum inequality
- Welch bounds

=== Algebra ===
- Abhyankar's inequality
- Pisier–Ringrose inequality

==== Linear algebra ====
- Abel's inequality
- Bregman–Minc inequality
- Cauchy–Schwarz inequality
- Golden–Thompson inequality
- Hadamard's inequality
- Hoffman-Wielandt inequality
- Peetre's inequality
- Sylvester's rank inequality
- Triangle inequality
- Trace inequalities

===== Eigenvalue inequalities =====
- Bendixson's inequality
- Weyl's inequality in matrix theory
- Cauchy interlacing theorem
- Poincaré separation theorem

=== Number theory ===
- Bonse's inequality
- Large sieve inequality
- Pólya–Vinogradov inequality
- Turán–Kubilius inequality
- Weyl's inequality

=== Probability theory and statistics ===
- Azuma's inequality
- Bennett's inequality, an upper bound on the probability that the sum of independent random variables deviates from its expected value by more than any specified amount
- Bhatia–Davis inequality, an upper bound on the variance of any bounded probability distribution
- Bernstein inequalities (probability theory)
- Boole's inequality
- Borell–TIS inequality
- BRS-inequality
- Burkholder's inequality
- Burkholder–Davis–Gundy inequalities
- Cantelli's inequality
- Chebyshev's inequality
- Chernoff's inequality
- Chung–Erdős inequality
- Concentration inequality
- Cramér–Rao inequality
- Doob's martingale inequality
- Dvoretzky–Kiefer–Wolfowitz inequality
- Eaton's inequality, a bound on the largest absolute value of a linear combination of bounded random variables
- Emery's inequality
- Entropy power inequality
- Etemadi's inequality
- Fannes–Audenaert inequality
- Fano's inequality
- Fefferman's inequality
- Fréchet inequalities
- Gauss's inequality
- Gauss–Markov theorem, the statement that the least-squares estimators in certain linear models are the best linear unbiased estimators
- Gaussian correlation inequality
- Gaussian isoperimetric inequality
- Gibbs's inequality
- Hoeffding's inequality
- Hoeffding's lemma
- Jensen's inequality
- Khintchine inequality
- Kolmogorov's inequality
- Kunita–Watanabe inequality
- Le Cam's theorem
- Lenglart's inequality
- Marcinkiewicz–Zygmund inequality
- Markov's inequality
- McDiarmid's inequality
- Paley–Zygmund inequality
- Pinsker's inequality
- Popoviciu's inequality on variances
- Prophet inequality
- Rao–Blackwell theorem
- Ross's conjecture, a lower bound on the average waiting time in certain queues
- Samuelson's inequality
- Shearer's inequality
- Stochastic Gronwall inequality
- Talagrand's concentration inequality
- Vitale's random Brunn–Minkowski inequality
- Vysochanskiï–Petunin inequality

=== Topology ===
- Berger's inequality for Einstein manifolds

== Inequalities particular to physics ==
- Ahlswede–Daykin inequality
- Bell's inequality – see Bell's theorem
  - Bell's original inequality
- CHSH inequality
- Clausius–Duhem inequality
- Correlation inequality – any of several inequalities
- FKG inequality
- Ginibre inequality
- Griffiths inequality
- Heisenberg's inequality
- Holley inequality
- Leggett–Garg inequality
- Riemannian Penrose inequality
- Rushbrooke inequality
- Tsirelson's inequality

== See also ==
- Comparison theorem
- List of mathematical identities
- Lists of mathematics topics
- List of set identities and relations
