= Peetre =

Family name

Peetre is an Estonian surname. Notable people with the surname include:

- Jaak Peetre (1935–2019), Estonian-Swedish mathematician
  - Peetre theorem
  - Peetre's inequality
- Taavi Peetre (1983–2010), Estonian shot putter

== See also ==
- Peeter
- Petre (disambiguation)
