= Comonotonicity =

Concept in probability theory

In probability theory, comonotonicity mainly refers to the perfect positive dependence between the components of a random vector, essentially saying that they can be represented as increasing functions of a single random variable. In two dimensions it is also possible to consider perfect negative dependence, which is called countermonotonicity.

Comonotonicity is also related to the comonotonic additivity of the Choquet integral.

The concept of comonotonicity has applications in financial risk management and actuarial science, see e.g. Dhaene et al. (2002a) and Dhaene et al. (2002b). In particular, the sum of the components X_{1} + X_{2} + · · · + X_{n} is the riskiest if the joint probability distribution of the random vector (X_{1}, X_{2}, . . . , X_{n}) is comonotonic. Furthermore, the α-quantile of the sum equals the sum of the α-quantiles of its components, hence comonotonic random variables are quantile-additive. In practical risk management terms it means that there is minimal (or eventually no) variance reduction from diversification.

For extensions of comonotonicity, see Jouini & Napp (2004) and Puccetti & Scarsini (2010).

== Definitions ==
=== Comonotonicity of subsets of R^{n} ===
A subset S of R^{n} is called comonotonic (sometimes also nondecreasing) if, for all (x_{1}, x_{2}, . . . , x_{n}) and (y_{1}, y_{2}, . . . , y_{n}) in S with x_{i} < y_{i} for some i ∈ {1, 2, . . . , n}, it follows that x_{j} ≤ y_{j} for all j ∈ {1, 2, . . . , n}.

This means that S is a totally ordered set.

=== Comonotonicity of probability measures on R^{n} ===
Let μ be a probability measure on the n-dimensional Euclidean space R^{n} and let F denote its multivariate cumulative distribution function, that is

$$F(x_1,\ldots,x_n):=\mu\bigl(\{(y_1,\ldots,y_n)\in{\mathbb R}^n\mid y_1\le x_1,\ldots,y_n\le x_n\}\bigr),\qquad (x_1,\ldots,x_n)\in{\mathbb R}^n.$$

Furthermore, let F_{1}, . . . , F_{n} denote the cumulative distribution functions of the n one-dimensional marginal distributions of μ, that means

$$F_i(x):=\mu\bigl(\{(y_1,\ldots,y_n)\in{\mathbb R}^n\mid y_i\le x\}\bigr),\qquad x\in{\mathbb R}$$

for every i ∈ {1, 2, . . . , n}. Then μ is called comonotonic, if

$$F(x_1,\ldots,x_n)=\min_{i\in\{1,\ldots,n\}}F_i(x_i),\qquad (x_1,\ldots,x_n)\in{\mathbb R}^n.$$

Note that the probability measure μ is comonotonic if and only if its support S is comonotonic according to the above definition.

=== Comonotonicity of R^{n}-valued random vectors ===
An R^{n}-valued random vector X = (X_{1}, . . . , X_{n}) is called comonotonic, if its multivariate distribution (the pushforward measure) is comonotonic, this means

$$\Pr(X_1\le x_1,\ldots,X_n\le x_n)=\min_{i\in\{1,\ldots,n\}} \Pr(X_i\le x_i),\qquad (x_1,\ldots,x_n)\in{\mathbb R}^n.$$

== Properties ==
An R^{n}-valued random vector X = (X_{1}, . . . , X_{n}) is comonotonic if and only if it can be represented as

$$(X_1,\ldots,X_n)=_\text{d}(F_{X_1}^{-1}(U),\ldots,F_{X_n}^{-1}(U)), \,$$

where =_{d} stands for equality in distribution, on the right-hand side are the left-continuous generalized inverses of the cumulative distribution functions F_{X_{1}}, . . . , F_{X_{n}}, and U is a uniformly distributed random variable on the unit interval. More generally, a random vector is comonotonic if and only if it agrees in distribution with a random vector where all components are non-decreasing functions (or all are non-increasing functions) of the same random variable.

== Upper bounds ==
=== Upper Fréchet–Hoeffding bound for cumulative distribution functions ===
Let X = (X_{1}, . . . , X_{n}) be an R^{n}-valued random vector. Then, for every i ∈ {1, 2, . . . , n},

$$\Pr(X_1\le x_1,\ldots,X_n\le x_n) \le \Pr(X_i\le x_i),\qquad (x_1,\ldots,x_n)\in{\mathbb R}^n,$$

hence

$$\Pr(X_1\le x_1,\ldots,X_n\le x_n)\le\min_{i\in\{1,\ldots,n\}} \Pr(X_i\le x_i),\qquad (x_1,\ldots,x_n)\in{\mathbb R}^n,$$

with equality everywhere if and only if (X_{1}, . . . , X_{n}) is comonotonic.

=== Upper bound for the covariance ===
Let (X, Y) be a bivariate random vector such that the expected values of X, Y and the product XY exist. Let (X^{*}, Y^{*}) be a comonotonic bivariate random vector with the same one-dimensional marginal distributions as (X, Y). (Note: (X^{*}, Y^{*}) always exists, take for example (F_{X}^{−1}(U), F_{Y}^{−1}(U)), see section Properties above.) Then it follows from Höffding's formula for the covariance and the upper Fréchet–Hoeffding bound that

$$\text{Cov}(X,Y)\le\text{Cov}(X^*,Y^*)$$

and, correspondingly,

$$\operatorname E[XY]\le \operatorname E[X^*Y^*]$$

with equality if and only if (X, Y) is comonotonic.

Note that this result generalizes the rearrangement inequality and Chebyshev's sum inequality.

== See also ==
- Copula (probability theory)
