= Weyl's theorem =

In mathematics, Weyl's theorem or Weyl's lemma might refer to one of a number of results of Hermann Weyl. These include

- the Peter–Weyl theorem
- Weyl's theorem on complete reducibility, results originally derived from the unitarian trick on representation theory of semisimple groups and semisimple Lie algebras
- Weyl's theorem on eigenvalues
- Weyl's criterion for equidistribution (Weyl's criterion)
- Weyl's lemma on the hypoellipticity of the Laplace equation
- results estimating Weyl sums in the theory of exponential sums
- Weyl's inequality
- Weyl's criterion for a number to be in the essential spectrum of an operator
- Weyl's law that describes the asymptotic behavior of large eigenvalues of the Laplace–Beltrami operator
