= Three spheres =

Three spheres, triple spheres, and related terms may refer to any of the following:

== Architecture ==
- Amazon Spheres, a set of conservatories located at Amazon's Seattle headquarters

== Art ==
- Three Spheres II, a 1946 lithograph by M. C. Escher

== History ==
- Three-world model, Cold War geopolitical model

== Humanities ==
- Hallin's spheres, a media theory formulated by Daniel C. Hallin
- Social threefolding, a social theory formulated by Rudolf Steiner
- The three spheres of right, a concept in Hegelian philosophy

== Mathematics ==
- a 3-sphere, an n-sphere whose surface is three-dimensional
- three spheres inequality, a bound of a harmonic function on a sphere

== Religion ==
- Gankyil § Three Spheres, a concept in some schools of Buddhism
- Trailokya, a cosmological concept in Indian religions

== Science ==
- Triple star system, a star system composed of three stars

== Symbols ==
- the three‐ball symbol, the traditional symbol of pawnbrokers

== See also ==
- Three-body problem (disambiguation)
