= Nesbitt's inequality =

Mathematical inequality

In mathematics, Nesbitt's inequality, named after Alfred Nesbitt, (Note: Cf. „Nesbitt, A. M.“ in zbMATH Open .) states that for positive real numbers a, b and c,

$$\frac{a}{b+c} + \frac{b}{a+c} + \frac{c}{a+b} \geq \frac{3}{2},$$

with equality only when $a=b=c$ (i. e. in an equilateral triangle).

There is no corresponding upper bound as any of the 3 fractions in the inequality can be made arbitrarily large.

It is the three-variable case of the rather more difficult Shapiro inequality, and was published at least 50 years earlier.

== Proof ==
=== First proof: AM-HM inequality ===
By the AM-HM inequality on $(a+b),(b+c),(c+a)$,

$$\frac{(a+b)+(a+c)+(b+c)}{3} \geq \frac{3}{\displaystyle\frac{1}{a+b} + \frac{1}{a+c} + \frac{1}{b+c}}.$$

Clearing denominators yields

$$((a+b)+(a+c)+(b+c))\left(\frac{1}{a+b} + \frac{1}{a+c} + \frac{1}{b+c}\right)\geq 9,$$

from which we obtain

$$2\frac{a+b+c}{b+c} + 2\frac{a+b+c}{a+c} + 2\frac{a+b+c}{a+b} \geq 9$$

by expanding the product and collecting like denominators. This then simplifies directly to the final result.

=== Second proof: Rearrangement ===
Supposing $a \ge b \ge c$, we have that

$$\frac{1}{b+c} \ge \frac{1}{a+c} \ge \frac{1}{a+b}.$$

Define

$\vec{x} = (a,b,c)\quad$ and $\quad\vec{y} = \left(\frac{1}{b+c} , \frac{1}{a+c} , \frac{1}{a+b}\right)$.

By the rearrangement inequality, the dot product of the two sequences is maximized when the terms are arranged to be both increasing or both decreasing. The order here is both decreasing. Let $\vec y_1$ and $\vec y_2$ be the vector $\vec y$ cyclically shifted by one and by two places; then

$$\vec{x} \cdot \vec{y} \ge \vec{x} \cdot \vec y_1$$
$$\vec{x} \cdot \vec{y} \ge \vec{x} \cdot \vec y_2$$

Addition then yields Nesbitt's inequality.

=== Third proof: Sum of Squares ===
The following identity is true for all $a,b,c:$

$$\frac{a}{b+c} + \frac{b}{a+c} + \frac{c}{a+b} = \frac{3}{2} + \frac{1}{2} \left(\frac{(a-b)^2}{(a+c)(b+c)} + \frac{(a-c)^2}{(a+b)(b+c)} + \frac{(b-c)^2}{(a+b)(a+c)}\right).$$

This clearly proves that the left side is no less than $3/2$ for positive a, b and c.

Note: every rational inequality can be demonstrated by transforming it to the appropriate sum-of-squares identity—see Hilbert's seventeenth problem.

=== Fourth proof: Cauchy–Schwarz ===
Invoking the Cauchy–Schwarz inequality on the vectors $\displaystyle\left\langle\sqrt{a+b},\sqrt{b+c},\sqrt{c+a}\right\rangle,\left\langle\frac{1}{\sqrt{a+b}},\frac{1}{\sqrt{b+c}},\frac{1}{\sqrt{c+a}}\right\rangle$ yields

$$((b+c)+(a+c)+(a+b))\left(\frac{1}{b+c} + \frac{1}{a+c} + \frac{1}{a+b}\right) \geq 9,$$

which can be transformed into the final result as we did in the AM-HM proof.

=== Fifth proof: AM-GM ===
Let $x=a+b, y=b+c, z=c+a$. We then apply the AM-GM inequality to obtain

$$\frac{x+z}{y} + \frac{y+z}{x} + \frac{x+y}{z} \geq 6,$$

because $\frac{x}{y} + \frac{z}{y} + \frac{y}{x} + \frac{z}{x} + \frac{x}{z} + \frac{y}{z} \geq 6\sqrt[6]{\frac{x}{y} \cdot \frac{z}{y} \cdot \frac{y}{x} \cdot \frac{z}{x} \cdot \frac{x}{z} \cdot \frac{y}{z}} = 6.$

Substituting out the $x,y,z$ in favor of $a,b,c$ yields

$$\frac{2a+b+c}{b+c} + \frac{a+b+2c}{a+b} + \frac{a+2b+c}{c+a} \geq 6$$
$$\frac{2a}{b+c} + \frac{2c}{a+b} + \frac{2b}{a+c} + 3 \geq 6,$$

which then simplifies to the final result.

=== Sixth proof: Titu's lemma ===
Titu's lemma, a direct consequence of the Cauchy–Schwarz inequality, states that for any sequence of $n$ real numbers $(x_k)$ and any sequence of $n$ positive numbers $(a_k)$, $\displaystyle\sum_{k=1}^n\frac{x_k^2}{a_k}\geq\frac{(\sum_{k=1}^n x_k)^2}{\sum_{k=1}^n a_k}.$

We use the lemma on $(x_k)=(1,1,1)$ and $(a_k)=(b+c,a+c,a+b)$. This gives

$$\frac{1}{b+c} + \frac{1}{c+a} + \frac{1}{a+b} \geq \frac{3^2}{2(a+b+c)},$$

which results in

$\frac{a+b+c}{b+c} + \frac{a+b+c}{c+a} + \frac{a+b+c}{a+b} \geq \frac{9}{2}$ i.e.,
$$\frac{a}{b+c} + \frac{b}{c+a} + \frac{c}{a+b} \geq \frac{9}{2} - 3 = \frac{3}{2}.$$

=== Seventh proof: Using homogeneity ===
As the left side of the inequality is homogeneous, we may assume $a+b+c=1$. Now define $x=a+b$, $y=b+c$, and $z=c+a$. The desired inequality turns into $\frac{1-x}{x} + \frac{1-y}{y} + \frac{1-z}{z} \ge \frac{3}{2}$, or, equivalently, $\frac{1}{x} + \frac{1}{y} + \frac{1}{z} \ge \frac{9}{2}$. This is clearly true by Titu's Lemma.

=== Eighth proof: Jensen's inequality ===
Let $S=a+b+c$ and consider the function $f(x)=\frac{x}{S-x}$. This function can be shown to be convex in $[0,S]$ and, invoking Jensen's inequality, we get

$$\displaystyle \frac{\frac{a}{S-a} + \frac{b}{S-b} + \frac{c}{S-c}}{3} \geq \frac{S/3}{S-S/3}.$$

A straightforward computation then yields

$$\frac{a}{b+c} + \frac{b}{c+a} + \frac{c}{a+b} \geq \frac{3}{2}.$$

=== Ninth proof: Reduction to a two-variable inequality ===
By clearing denominators,

$$\frac{a}{b+c} + \frac{b}{a+c} + \frac{c}{a+b} \geq \frac{3}{2} \iff 2(a^3+b^3+c^3) \geq ab^2 + a^2b + ac^2 + a^2c + bc^2 + b^2c.$$

It therefore suffices to prove that $x^3+y^3 \geq xy^2+x^2y$ for $(x,y) \in \mathbb{R}^2_+$, as summing this three times for $(x,y) = (a,b),\ (a,c),$ and $(b,c)$ completes the proof.

As $x^3+y^3 \geq xy^2+x^2y \iff (x-y)(x^2-y^2) \geq 0$ we are done.
