= Johan Frederik Steffensen =

Danish mathematician and statistician (1873–1961)

Johan Frederik Steffensen (28 February 1873, in Copenhagen – 20 December 1961) was a Danish mathematician, statistician, and actuary who did research in the fields of calculus of finite differences and interpolation. He was professor of actuarial science at the University of Copenhagen from 1923 to 1943. Steffensen's inequality and Steffensen's method (an iterative numerical method) are named after him. He was an Invited Speaker at the 1912 International Congress of Mathematicians (ICM) in Cambridge, England and at the 1924 ICM in Toronto.

... His more important works included the theory of statistics (1923), interpolation (1925), insurance mathematics (1934) and the calculation of interest (1936). ... He was President of the Danish Actuarial Society in 1922-24 and 1930-33, and of the Danish Mathematical Society in 1930-36 ...

== Publications ==
- Factorial moments and discontinuous frequency-functions. Uppsala: Almqvist & Wiksells Boktryckeri-A.B. 1923; 89 pages
- Interpolation. London: Williams & Wilkins. 1927.

== Obituary ==
- Nordlund N. E. (1962). "Johan Frederik Steffensen in memoriam". Nordisk Matematisk Tidsskrift. 10: 105–107.
