= Fannes–Audenaert inequality =

The Fannes–Audenaert inequality is a mathematical bound on the difference between the von Neumann entropies of two density matrices as a function of their trace distance. It was proved by Koenraad M. R. Audenaert in 2007 as an optimal refinement of Mark Fannes' original inequality, which was published in 1973. Mark Fannes is a Belgian physicist specialised in mathematical quantum mechanics, and he works at the KU Leuven. Koenraad M. R. Audenaert is a Belgian physicist and civil engineer. He currently works at University of Ulm.

== Statement of inequality ==
For any two density matrices $\rho$ and $\sigma$ of dimensions $d$,

$$|S(\rho)-S(\sigma)| \le T \log (d-1) + H[\{T,1-T\}]$$

where

$$H[\{p_i\}] = - \sum p_i \log p_i$$

is the (Shannon) entropy of the probability distribution $\{p_i\}$,

$$S(\rho) = H[\{\lambda_i\}]$$

is the (von Neumann) entropy of a matrix $\rho$ with eigenvalues $\lambda_i$, and

$$T(\rho,\sigma) = \frac{1}{2}||\rho-\sigma||_{1} = \frac{1}{2}\mathrm{Tr} \left[ \sqrt{(\rho-\sigma)^\dagger (\rho-\sigma)} \right]$$

is the trace distance between the two matrices. Note that the base for the logarithm is arbitrary, so long as the same base is used on both sides of the inequality.

Audenaert also proved that—given only the trace distance T and the dimension d—this is the optimal bound. He did this by directly exhibiting a pair of matrices which saturate the bound for any values of T and d. The matrices (which are diagonal in the same basis, i.e. they commute) are

$$\rho = \mathrm{Diag}(1-T, T/(d-1),\dots,T/(d-1))$$
$$\sigma = \mathrm{Diag}(1,0,\dots,0)$$

== Fannes' inequality and Audenaert's refinement ==
The original inequality proved by Fannes was

$$|S(\rho)-S(\sigma)| \le 2T \log (d) -2T \log 2T$$

when $T \le 1/2e$. He also proved the weaker inequality

$$|S(\rho)-S(\sigma)| \le 2T \log (d) + 1 / (e \log 2)$$

which can be used for larger T.

Fannes proved this inequality as a means to prove the continuity of the von Neumann entropy, which did not require an optimal bound. The proof is very compact, and can be found in the textbook by Nielsen and Chuang. Audenaert's proof of the optimal inequality, on the other hand, is significantly more complicated, and can be found in.
