= Log sum inequality =

Inequality of sum of product of number and logarithm of ratios

The log sum inequality is used for proving theorems in information theory.

== Statement ==
Let $a_1,\ldots,a_n$ and $b_1,\ldots,b_n$ be nonnegative numbers. Denote the sum of all $a_i$s by $a$ and the sum of all $b_i$s by $b$. The log sum inequality states that

$$\sum_{i=1}^n a_i\log\frac{a_i}{b_i}\geq a\log\frac{a}{b},$$

with equality if and only if $\frac{a_i}{b_i} = \frac{a}{b}$ for all $i$.

(Take $a_i\log \frac{a_i}{b_i}$ to be $0$ if $a_i=0$ and $\infty$ if $a_i>0, b_i=0$. These are the limiting values obtained as the relevant number tends to $0$.)

== Proof ==
Notice that after setting $f(x)=x\log x$ we have

$$\begin{align}
\sum_{i=1}^n a_i\log\frac{a_i}{b_i} & {} = \sum_{i=1}^n b_i f\left(\frac{a_i}{b_i}\right)
= b\sum_{i=1}^n \frac{b_i}{b} f\left(\frac{a_i}{b_i}\right) \\
& {} \geq b f\left(\sum_{i=1}^n \frac{b_i}{b}\frac{a_i}{b_i}\right) = b f\left(\frac{1}{b}\sum_{i=1}^n a_i\right)
= b f\left(\frac{a}{b}\right) \\
& {} = a\log\frac{a}{b},
\end{align}$$

where the inequality follows from Jensen's inequality since $\frac{b_i}{b}\geq 0$, $\sum_{i=1}^n\frac{b_i}{b}= 1$, and $f$ is convex.

== Generalizations ==
The inequality remains valid for $n=\infty$ provided that $a<\infty$ and $b<\infty$. The proof above holds for any function $g$ such that $f(x)=xg(x)$ is convex, such as all continuous non-decreasing functions. Generalizations to non-decreasing functions other than the logarithm is given in Csiszár, 2004.

Another generalization is due to Dannan, Neff and Thiel, who showed that if $a_1, a_2 \cdots a_n$ and $b_1, b_2 \cdots b_n$ are positive real numbers with $a_1+ a_2 \cdots +a_n=a$ and $b_1 + b_2 \cdots +b_n=b$, and $k \geq 0$, then $\sum_{i=1}^n a_i \log\left( \frac{a_i}{b_i} +k \right) \geq a\log \left(\frac{a}{b}+k\right)$.

== Applications ==
The log sum inequality can be used to prove inequalities in information theory. Gibbs' inequality states that the Kullback–Leibler divergence is non-negative, and equal to zero precisely if its arguments are equal. One proof uses the log sum inequality.

Proof
Let $P=(p_i)_{i\in\mathbb{N}}$ and $Q=(q_i)_{i\in\mathbb{N}}$ be pmfs. In the log sum inequality, substitute $n=\infty$, $a_i=p_i$ and $b_i=q_i$ to get

$$\mathbb{D}_{\mathrm{KL}}(P\|Q) \equiv \sum_{i} p_i \log_2 \frac{p_i}{q_i} \geq 1\log\frac{1}{1} = 0$$

with equality if and only if $p_i=q_i$ for all i (as both $P$ and $Q$ sum to 1).

The inequality can also prove convexity of Kullback–Leibler divergence.
