= Steffensen's inequality =

Equation in mathematics

Steffensen's inequality is a mathematical inequality named after Johan Frederik Steffensen.

It is an integral inequality in real analysis, stating:

If ƒ : [a, b] → R is a non-negative, monotonically decreasing, integrable function
and g : [a, b] → [0, 1] is another integrable function, then

$$\int_{b - k}^{b} f(x) \, dx \leq \int_{a}^{b} f(x) g(x) \, dx \leq \int_{a}^{a + k} f(x) \, dx,$$

where

$$k = \int_{a}^{b} g(x) \, dx.$$

== Sources ==
- Mitrinović, D. S. (1970). "2.16". Analytic Inequalities. In cooperation with P. M. Vasić. Die Grundlehren der mathematischen Wissenschaften in Einzeldarstellungen. Vol. 165. Berlin, Heidelberg, New York: Springer-Verlag. doi:10.1007/978-3-642-99970-3. ISBN 978-3-642-99972-7. Zbl 0199.38101.
