= Jaak Peetre =

Estonian-born Swedish mathematician (1935–2019)

Jaak Peetre (29 July 1935, in Tallinn – 1 April 2019, in Lund) was an Estonian-born Swedish mathematician. He is known for the Peetre theorem and Peetre's inequality.

== Biography ==
Jaak Peetre's father was Arthur Peetre (1907–1989), an Estonian jurist, historian, archivist, and from 1941 to 1942 mayor of Pärnu. Jaak Peetre went to Sweden with his parents and brother in 1944. At Lund University he graduated with BSc in 1956 and PhD in 1959. His thesis advisor was Åke Pleijel. At Lund University, Peetre was an assistant professor from 1956 to 1959, an associate professor from 1960 to 1963, and full professor from 1963 to 1988. He was briefly in 1988 a visiting professor at the University of Madrid and was from 1988 to 1992 a visiting professor at Stockholm University. At Lund University he was a lecturer from 1993 to 1997, an assistant professor from 1997 to 2000, and professor emeritus from 2000. He was also a visiting professor at New York University for the academic year 1960–1961 and at University of Maryland for the academic year 1961–1962.

Peetre's research deals with ordinary and partial derivative differential equations, operator interpolation spaces, singular integrals and Besov spaces, differential geometry, Clifford analysis, Fock space and Hankel operators, Fourier and harmonic analysis. Bernard Malgrange, Jacques-Louis Lions, and Peetre were pioneers of modern interpolation theory. In the early 1990s, Peetre's research focused on multilinear forms, especially trilinear forms. He was the author or coauthor of more than 230 research papers. He was the thesis advisor for 8 doctoral students. In 1970 he was an Invited Speaker at the International Congress of Mathematicians in Nice. He gave lectures at more than 30 international mathematical congresses and conferences and in many cases was among the organizers. He was a member of the editorial boards of several international mathematical journals.

In 1984 he was elected a member of the Swedish Royal Academy of Sciences. From 1984 to 1987 he was the president of the Swedish Mathematical Society. In 1998 he was awarded the Royal Society of Sciences in Uppsala's Celsius Gold Medal.

Jaak Peetre was the most prolific Estonian mathematician of his era, often visiting Estonia and giving lectures there. In 1994 he was a founding member of the Estonian Mathematical Society. In 2001 he was awarded the Order of the White Star, 3rd Class. In 2008 he was elected a foreign member of the Estonian Academy of Science.

== Selected publications ==
=== Articles ===
- Peetre, Jaak (1959). "Une Caractérisation Abstraite des Opérateurs Différentiels". Mathematica Scandinavica. 7 (1): 211–218. doi:10.7146/math.scand.a-10574. JSTOR 24489021.
- Peetre, Jaak (1957). "A Generalization of Courant's Nodal Domain Theorem". Mathematica Scandinavica. 5 (1): 15–20. doi:10.7146/math.scand.a-10484. JSTOR 24490131.
- Peetre, J. (1961). "Mixed problems for higher order elliptic equations in two variables, I." (PDF). Annali della Scuola Normale Superiore di Pisa-Classe di Scienze. 15 (4): 337–353.
- Peetre, J. (1962). "On the differentiability of the solutions of quasilinear partial differential equations". Transactions of the American Mathematical Society. 104 (3): 476–482. doi:10.1090/S0002-9947-1962-0146518-1. ISSN 0002-9947.
- Lions, J. L.; Peetre, J. (1964). "Sur une classe d'espaces d'interpolation" (PDF). Publications Mathématiques de l'IHÉS. 19: 5–68. doi:10.1007/BF02684796. S2CID 124471748. (Over 900 citations)
- Peetre, J. (1966). "Espaces d'interpolation et théorème de Soboleff". Annales de l'Institut Fourier. 16 (1): 279–317. doi:10.5802/aif.232.
- Peetre, Jaak (1969). "On the theory of L_{p,λ} spaces". Journal of Functional Analysis. 4: 71–87. doi:10.1016/0022-1236(69)90022-6.
- Holmstedt, T.; Peetre, J. (1969). "On certain functionals arising in the theory of interpolation spaces" (PDF). Journal of Functional Analysis. 4 (1): 88–94. doi:10.1016/0022-1236(69)90023-8.
- Peetre, J.; Sparr, G. (1972). "Interpolation of normed abelian groups". Annali di Matematica Pura ed Applicata. 92: 217–262. doi:10.1007/BF02417949. S2CID 121904777.
- Peetre, Jaak (1975). "On spaces of Triebel-Lizorkin type". Arkiv för Matematik. 13 (1–2): 123–130. Bibcode:1975ArM....13..123P. doi:10.1007/BF02386201. MR 0380394.
- Peetre, J. (1975). "A remark on Sobolev spaces. The case 0< p< 1" (PDF). Journal of Approximation Theory. 13 (3): 218–228. doi:10.1016/0021-9045(75)90034-9.
- Peetre, J. (1979). "Two new interpolation methods based on the duality map" (PDF). Acta Mathematica. 143: 73–91. doi:10.1007/BF02392089. S2CID 121740083.
- Peetre, J. (1980). "On Hadamard's variational formula" (PDF). Journal of Differential Equations. 36 (3): 335–346. Bibcode:1980JDE....36..335P. doi:10.1016/0022-0396(80)90053-4.
- Janson, Svante; Peetre, Jaak; Semmes, Stephen (1984). "On the action of Hankel and Toeplitz operators on some function spaces". Duke Mathematical Journal. 51 (4): 937–958. doi:10.1215/S0012-7094-84-05142-1.
- Fisher, S. D.; Arazy, J.; Peetre, J. (1985). "Möbius invariant function spaces". Journal für die reine und angewandte Mathematik. 1985 (363): 110–145. doi:10.1515/crll.1985.363.110. S2CID 120842922.
- Janson, Svante; Peetre, Jaak (1987). "A New Generalization of Hankel Operators (the Case of Higher Weights)". Mathematische Nachrichten. 132 (1): 313–328. doi:10.1002/mana.19871320121. ISSN 0025-584X.
- Janson, Svante; Peetre, Jaak (1988). "Paracommutators―boundedness and Schatten-von Neumann properties". Transactions of the American Mathematical Society. 305 (2): 467. doi:10.1090/S0002-9947-1988-0924766-6.
- Arazy, J.; Fisher, S. D.; Peetre, J. (1988). "Hankel Operators on Weighted Bergman Spaces". American Journal of Mathematics. 110 (6): 989–1053. doi:10.2307/2374685. JSTOR 2374685.
- Cobos, Fernando; Peetre, Jaak (1989). "Interpolation of compactness using Aronszajn-Gagliardo functors". Israel Journal of Mathematics. 68 (2): 220–240. doi:10.1007/BF02772662. S2CID 120426208.
- Peetre, Jaak (1990). "The Berezin Transform and Ha-Plitz Operators". Journal of Operator Theory. 24 (1): 165–186. JSTOR 24714631.
- Fisher, S. D.; Arazy, J.; Janson, S.; Peetre, J. (1990). "An identity for reproducing kernels in a planar domain and Hilbert-Schmidt Hankel operators". Journal für die reine und angewandte Mathematik. 1990 (406): 179–199. doi:10.1515/crll.1990.406.179. S2CID 117856717.
- Arazy, Jonathan; Fisher, Stephen D.; Janson, Svante; Peetre, Jaak (1991). "Membership of Hankel Operators on the Ball in Unitary Ideals". Journal of the London Mathematical Society (3): 485–508. doi:10.1112/jlms/s2-43.3.485.
- Cobos, Fernando; Peetre, Jaak (1991). "Interpolation of Compact Operators: The Multidimensional Case". Proceedings of the London Mathematical Society (2): 371–400. doi:10.1112/plms/s3-63.2.371.
- Peetre, Jaak; Sjölin, Per S (1992). "Three-line theorems and clifford analysis". Complex Variables, Theory and Application. 19 (3): 92–124. doi:10.1080/17476939208814568. ISSN 0278-1077.
- Peetre, Jaak; Qian, Tao (1994). "Möbius covariance of iterated Dirac operators". Journal of the Australian Mathematical Society, Series A. 56 (3): 403–414. doi:10.1017/S1446788700035576.
- Cobos, Fernando; Peetre, Jaak; Persson, Lars Erik (1998). "On the connection between real and complex interpolation of quasi-banach spaces". Bulletin des Sciences Mathématiques. 122: 17–37. doi:10.1016/S0007-4497(98)80075-4.
- Lindqvist, Peter; Peetre, Jaak (2001). "Two Remarkable Identities, Called Twos, for Inverses to Some Abelian Integrals". The American Mathematical Monthly. 108 (5): 403–410. doi:10.1080/00029890.2001.11919766. S2CID 43677974.
- Bernhardsson, Bo; Peetre, Jaak (2001). "Singular Values of Trilinear Forms". Experimental Mathematics. 10 (4): 509–517. doi:10.1080/10586458.2001.10504670. S2CID 4455661.

=== Books ===
- Lumiste, Ülo; Peetre, Jaak, eds. (1994). Edgar Krahn 1894-1961: A Centenary Volume. IOS Press. ISBN 9789051991680. (See Edgar Krahn.)
