= Peetre's inequality =

In mathematics, Peetre's inequality, named after Jaak Peetre, says that for any real number $t$ and any vectors $x$ and $y$ in $\Reals^n,$ the following inequality holds: $\left(\frac{1+|x|^2}{1+|y|^2}\right)^t ~\leq~ 2^{|t|} (1+|x-y|^2)^{|t|}.$

The inequality was proved by J. Peetre in 1959 and has founds applications in functional analysis and Sobolev spaces.

== See also ==
- List of inequalities
