= Khabibullin's conjecture on integral inequalities =

Khabibullin's conjecture is a conjecture in mathematics related to Paley's problem for plurisubharmonic functions and to various extremal problems in the theory of entire functions of several variables. The conjecture was named after its proposer, B. N. Khabibullin.

There are three versions of the conjecture, one in terms of logarithmically convex functions, one in terms of increasing functions, and one in terms of non-negative functions. The conjecture has implications in the study of complex functions and is related to Euler's Beta function. While the conjecture is known to hold for certain conditions, counterexamples have also been found.

== The first statement in terms of logarithmically convex functions ==
Khabibullin's conjecture (version 1, 1992). Let $\displaystyle S$ be a non-negative increasing function on the half-line $[0,+\infty)$ such that $\displaystyle S(0)=0$. Assume that $\displaystyle S(e^x)$ is a convex function of $x\in[-\infty,+\infty)$. Let $\lambda\geq 1/2$, $n\geq 2$, and $n\in\mathbb N$. If

$\int^1_0 S(tx)\,(1-x^2)^{n-2}\,x\,dx\leq t^\lambda\text{ for all }t\in[0,+\infty),$	1

then

$\int^{+\infty}_0 S(t)\,\frac{t^{2\lambda-1}}{(1+t^{2\lambda})^2}\,dt\leq \frac{\pi\,(n-1)}{2\lambda}\prod_{k=1}^{n-1} \Bigl(1+\frac{\lambda}{2k}\Bigr).$	2

This statement of the Khabibullin's conjecture completes his survey.

== Relation to Euler's Beta function ==
The product in the right hand side of the inequality (2) is related to the Euler's Beta function $\Beta$:

$$\frac{\pi\,(n-1)}{2\lambda}\prod_{k=1}^{n-1} \Bigl(1+\frac{\lambda}{2k}\Bigr)=\frac{\pi\,(n-1)}{\lambda^2}\cdot\frac{1}{\Beta(\lambda/2,n)}$$

== Discussion ==
For each fixed $\lambda\geq 1/2$ the function

$$S(t)=2(n-1)\prod_{k=1}^{n-1} \Bigl(1+\frac{\lambda}{2k}\Bigr)
\, t^{\lambda},$$

turns the inequalities (1) and (2) to equalities.

The Khabibullin's conjecture is valid for $\lambda\leq 1$ without the assumption of convexity of $S(e^x)$. Meanwhile, one can show that this conjecture is not valid without some convexity conditions for $S$. In 2010, R. A. Sharipov showed that the conjecture fails in the case $n=2$ and for $\lambda=2$.

== The second statement in terms of increasing functions ==
Khabibullin's conjecture (version 2). Let $\displaystyle h$ be a non-negative increasing function on the half-line $[0,+\infty)$ and $\alpha>1/2$. If

$$\int_0^1 \frac{h(tx)}{x} \,(1-x)^{n-1}\,dx \leq t^\alpha\text{ for all }t\in[0,+\infty),$$

then

$$\int_0^{+\infty}\frac{h(t)}{t}\,\frac{dt}{1+t^{2\alpha}}\leq
\frac{\pi}{2} \prod_{k=1}^{n-1} \Bigl(1+\frac{\alpha}{k}\Bigr)=
\frac{\pi}{2\alpha} \cdot \frac{1}{\mathrm B (\alpha, n)}.$$

== The third statement in terms of non-negative functions ==
Khabibullin's conjecture (version 3). Let $\displaystyle q$ be a non-negative continuous function on the half-line $[0,+\infty)$ and $\alpha>1/2$. If

$$\int_0^1 \Bigl(\,\int_x^1 (1-y)^{n-1} \frac{dy}{y}\Bigr)q(tx)\,dx
\leq t^{\alpha-1}\text{ for all }t\in[0,+\infty),$$

then

$$\int_0^{+\infty} q(t)\log \Bigl(1+\frac1{t^{2\alpha}}\Bigr)\,dt\leq
\pi \alpha \prod_{k=1}^{n-1} \Bigl(1+\frac{\alpha}{k}\Bigr)=
\frac{\pi}{\mathrm B (\alpha, n)}.$$

== See also ==
- Logarithmically convex function
