= Peetre theorem =

In mathematics, the (linear) Peetre theorem, named after Jaak Peetre, is a result of functional analysis that gives a characterisation of differential operators in terms of their effect on generalized function spaces, and without mentioning differentiation in explicit terms. The Peetre theorem is an example of a finite order theorem in which a function or a functor, defined in a very general way, can in fact be shown to be a polynomial because of some extraneous condition or symmetry imposed upon it.

This article treats two forms of the Peetre theorem. The first is the original version which, although quite useful in its own right, is actually too general for most applications.

== The original Peetre theorem ==
Let M be a smooth manifold and let E and F be two vector bundles on M. Let

$$\Gamma^\infty (E),\ \hbox{and}\ \Gamma^\infty (F)$$

be the spaces of smooth sections of E and F. An operator

$$D:\Gamma^\infty (E)\rightarrow \Gamma^\infty(F)$$

is a morphism of sheaves which is linear on sections such that the support of D is non-increasing: supp Ds ⊆ supp s for every smooth section s of E. The original Peetre theorem asserts that, for every point p in M, there is a neighborhood U of p and an integer k (depending on U) such that D is a differential operator of order k over U. This means that D factors through a linear mapping i_{D} from the k-jet of sections of E into the space of smooth sections of F:

$$D=i_D\circ j^k$$

where

$$j^k:\Gamma^\infty E\rightarrow J^kE$$

is the k-jet operator and

$$i_D:J^kE\rightarrow F$$

is a linear mapping of vector bundles.

=== Proof ===
The problem is invariant under local diffeomorphism, so it is sufficient to prove it when M is an open set in R^{n} and E and F are trivial bundles. At this point, it relies primarily on two lemmas:

- Lemma 1. If the hypotheses of the theorem are satisfied, then for every x∈M and C > 0, there exists a neighborhood V of x and a positive integer k such that for any y∈V\{x} and for any section s of E whose k-jet vanishes at y (j^{k}s(y)=0), we have |Ds(y)|<C.
- Lemma 2. The first lemma is sufficient to prove the theorem.

We begin with the proof of Lemma 1.

Suppose the lemma is false. Then there is a sequence x_{k} tending to x, and a sequence of very disjoint balls B_{k} around the x_{k} (meaning that the geodesic distance between any two such balls is non-zero), and sections s_{k} of E over each B_{k} such that j^{k}s_{k}(x_{k})=0 but |Ds_{k}(x_{k})|≥C>0.

Let ρ(x) denote a standard bump function for the unit ball at the origin: a smooth real-valued function which is equal to 1 on B_{1/2}(0), which vanishes to infinite order on the boundary of the unit ball.

Consider every other section s_{2k}. At x_{2k}, these satisfy

j^{2k}s_{2k}(x_{2k})=0.

Suppose that 2k is given. Then, since these functions are smooth and each satisfy j^{2k}(s_{2k})(x_{2k})=0, it is possible to specify a smaller ball B′_{δ}(x_{2k}) such that the higher order derivatives obey the following estimate:

$$\sum_{|\alpha|\le k}\ \sup_{y\in B'_\delta(x_{2k})} |\nabla^\alpha s_k(y)|\le \frac{1}{M_k}\left(\frac{\delta}{2}\right)^k$$

where

$$M_k=\sum_{|\alpha|\le k}\sup |\nabla^\alpha\rho|.$$

Now

$$\rho_{2k}(y):=\rho\left(\frac{y-x_{2k}}{\delta}\right)$$

is a standard bump function supported in B′_{δ}(x_{2k}), and the derivative of the product s_{2k}ρ_{2k} is bounded in such a way that

$$\max_{|\alpha|\le k}\ \sup_{y\in B'_\delta(x_{2k})}|\nabla^\alpha (\rho_{2k}s_{2k})|\le 2^{-k}.$$

As a result, because the following series and all of the partial sums of its derivatives converge uniformly

$$q(y)=\sum_{k=1}^\infty\rho_{2k}(y)s_{2k}(y),$$

q(y) is a smooth function on all of V.

We now observe that since s_{2k} and $\rho$_{2k}s_{2k} are equal in a neighborhood of x_{2k},

$$\lim_{k\rightarrow\infty}|Dq(x_{2k})|\ge C$$

So by continuity |Dq(x)|≥ C>0. On the other hand,

$$\lim_{k\rightarrow\infty}Dq(x_{2k+1})=0$$

since Dq(x_{2k+1})=0 because q is identically zero in B_{2k+1} and D is support non-increasing. So Dq(x)=0. This is a contradiction.

We now prove Lemma 2.

First, let us dispense with the constant C from the first lemma. We show that, under the same hypotheses as Lemma 1, |Ds(y)|=0. Pick a y in V\{x} so that j^{k}s(y)=0 but |Ds(y)|=g>0. Rescale s by a factor of 2C/g. Then if g is non-zero, by the linearity of D, |Ds(y)|=2C>C, which is impossible by Lemma 1. This proves the theorem in the punctured neighborhood V\{x}.

Now, we must continue the differential operator to the central point x in the punctured neighborhood. D is a linear differential operator with smooth coefficients. Furthermore, it sends germs of smooth functions to germs of smooth functions at x as well. Thus the coefficients of D are also smooth at x.

== A specialized application ==
Let M be a compact smooth manifold (possibly with boundary), and E and F be finite dimensional vector bundles on M. Let

$\Gamma^\infty (E)$be the collection of smooth sections of E. An operator

$$D:\Gamma^\infty (E)\rightarrow \Gamma^\infty (F)$$

is a smooth function (of Fréchet manifolds) which is linear on the fibres and respects the base point on M:

$$\pi\circ D_p=p.$$

The Peetre theorem asserts that for each operator D, there exists an integer k such that D is a differential operator of order k. Specifically, we can decompose

$$D=i_D\circ j^k$$

where $i_D$ is a mapping from the jets of sections of E to the bundle F. See also intrinsic differential operators.

== Example: Laplacian ==
Consider the following operator:

$$(L f)(x_0) = \lim_{r \to 0} \frac{2d}{r^2}\frac{1}{|S_r|} \int_{S_r} (f(x)-f(x_0)) dx$$

where $f \in C^\infty(\mathbb{R}^d)$ and $S_r$ is the sphere centered at $x_0$ with radius $r$. This is in fact the Laplacian, as can be seen using Taylor's theorem. We show will show $L$ is a differential operator by Peetre's theorem. The main idea is that since $Lf(x_0)$ is defined only in terms of $f$'s behavior near $x_0$, it is local in nature; in particular, if $f$ is locally zero, so is $Lf$, and hence the support cannot grow.

The technical proof goes as follows.

Let $M = \mathbb{R}^d$ and $E$ and $F$ be the rank $1$ trivial bundles.

Then $\Gamma^\infty(E)$ and $\Gamma^\infty(F)$ are simply the space $C^\infty(\mathbb{R}^d)$ of smooth functions on $\mathbb{R}^d$. As a sheaf, $\mathcal{F}(U)$ is the set of smooth functions on the open set $U$ and restriction is function restriction.

To see $L$ is indeed a morphism, we need to check $(Lu)|V = L(u|V)$ for open sets $U$ and $V$ such that $V \subseteq U$ and $u \in C^\infty(U)$. This is clear because for $x \in V$, both $[(Lu)|V](x)$ and $[L(u|V)](x)$ are simply $\lim_{r \to 0} \frac{2d}{r^2}\frac{1}{|S_r|} \int_{S_r} (u(y)-u(x)) dy$, as the $S_r$ eventually sits inside both $U$ and $V$ anyway.

It is easy to check that $L$ is linear:

$L(f + g) = L(f) + L(g)$ and $L(af) = aL(f)$

Finally, we check that $L$ is local in the sense that $supp Lf \subseteq supp f$. If $x_0 \notin supp(f)$, then $\exists r > 0$ such that $f = 0$ in the ball of radius $r$ centered at $x_0$. Thus, for $x \in B(x_0, r)$,

$$\int_{S_{r'}}(f(y)-f(x)) dy = 0$$

for $r' < r - |x - x_0|$, and hence $(Lf)(x) = 0$. Therefore, $x_0 \notin supp Lf$.

So by Peetre's theorem, $L$ is a differential operator.
