= Shapiro inequality =

Mathematical inequality related to Nesbitt's

In mathematics, the Shapiro inequality is an inequality proposed by Harold S. Shapiro in 1954.

== Statement of the inequality ==
Suppose n is a natural number and x_{1}, x_{2}, …, x_{n} are positive numbers and:

- n is even and less than or equal to 12, or
- n is odd and less than or equal to 23.

Then the Shapiro inequality states that

$$\sum_{i=1}^n \frac{x_i}{x_{i+1}+x_{i+2}} \geq \frac{n}{2},$$

where x_{n+1} = x_{1} and x_{n+2} = x_{2}. The special case with n = 3 is Nesbitt's inequality.

For greater values of n the inequality does not hold, and the strict lower bound is γ n/2 with γ ≈ 0.9891… (sequence A245330 in the OEIS).

The initial proofs of the inequality in the pivotal cases n = 12 and n = 23 rely on numerical computations. In 2002, P.J. Bushell and J.B. McLeod published an analytical proof for n = 12.

The value of γ was determined in 1971 by Vladimir Drinfeld. Specifically, he proved that the strict lower bound γ is given by ψ(0), where the function ψ is the convex hull of f(x) = e^{−x} and g(x) = 2 / (e^{x} + e^{x/2}). (That is, the region above the graph of ψ is the convex hull of the union of the regions above the graphs of f and g.)

Interior local minima of the left-hand side are always ≥ n / 2.

Similar to Nesbitt’s inequality, there is no corresponding upper bound as the cyclic sum inequality can be made arbitrarily large.

== Counter-examples for higher n ==
The first counter-example was found by Lighthill in 1956, for n = 20:

$$x_{20} = (1+5\epsilon,\ 6\epsilon,\ 1+4\epsilon,\ 5\epsilon,\ 1+3\epsilon,\ 4\epsilon,\ 1+2\epsilon,\ 3\epsilon,\ 1+\epsilon,\ 2\epsilon,\ 1+2\epsilon,\ \epsilon,\ 1+3\epsilon,\ 2\epsilon,\ 1+4\epsilon,\ 3\epsilon,\ 1+5\epsilon,\ 4\epsilon,\ 1+6\epsilon,\ 5\epsilon),$$

where $\epsilon$ is close to 0. Then the left-hand side is equal to $10 - \epsilon^2 + O(\epsilon^3)$, thus lower than 10 when $\epsilon$ is small enough.

The following counter-example for n = 14 is by Troesch (1985):

$x_{14} = (0, 42, 2, 42, 4, 41, 5, 39, 4, 38, 2, 38, 0, 40)$ (Troesch, 1985)
