= Hardy–Littlewood inequality =

Inequality type in mathematical analysis

In mathematical analysis, the Hardy–Littlewood inequality, named after G. H. Hardy and John Edensor Littlewood, states that if $f$ and $g$ are nonnegative measurable real functions vanishing at infinity that are defined on $n$-dimensional Euclidean space $\mathbb R^n$, then

$$\int_{\mathbb{R}^n} f(x)g(x) \, dx \leq \int_{\mathbb{R}^n} f^*(x)g^*(x) \, dx$$

where $f^*$ and $g^*$ are the symmetric decreasing rearrangements of $f$ and $g$, respectively.

The decreasing rearrangement $f^*$ of $f$ is defined via the property that for all $r >0$ the two super-level sets

$E_f(r)=\left\{x\in X: f(x)>r\right\} \quad$ and $\quad E_{f^*}(r)=\left\{x\in X: f^*(x)>r\right\}$

have the same volume ($n$-dimensional Lebesgue measure) and $E_{f^*}(r)$ is a ball in $\mathbb R^n$ centered at $x=0$, i.e. it has maximal symmetry.

== Proof ==
The layer cake representation allows us to write the general functions $f$ and $g$ in the form

$f(x)= \int_0^\infty \chi_{f(x)>r} \, dr \quad$ and $\quad g(x)= \int_0^\infty \chi_{g(x)>s} \, ds$

where $r \mapsto \chi_{f(x)>r}$ equals $1$ for $r< f(x)$ and $0$ otherwise. Analogously, $s \mapsto \chi_{g(x)>s}$ equals $1$ for $s< g(x)$ and $0$ otherwise.

Now the proof can be obtained by first using Fubini's theorem to interchange the order of integration. When integrating with respect to $x \in \mathbb R^n$ the conditions $f(x)>r$ and $g(x)>s$ the indicator functions $x \mapsto \chi_{E_f(r)}(x)$ and $x \mapsto \chi_{E_g(s)}(x)$ appear with the superlevel sets $E_f(r)$ and $E_g(s)$ as introduced above:

$\int_{\mathbb{R}^n} f(x)g(x) \, dx = \displaystyle\int_{\mathbb{R}^n}\int_0^\infty \chi_{f(x)>r} \, dr \; \int_0^\infty \chi_{g(x)>s} \, ds \, dx = \int_{\mathbb{R}^n}\int_0^\infty \int_0^\infty \chi_{f(x)>r}\; \chi_{g(x)>s} \, dr \, ds \, dx$

$$= \int_0^\infty \int_0^\infty \int_{\mathbb{R}^n}\chi_{E_f(r)}(x) \; \chi_{E_g(s)}(x) \, dx \, dr \, ds
= \int_0^\infty \int_0^\infty \int_{\mathbb{R}^n}\chi_{E_f(r) \cap E_g(s)}(x)  \, dx \, dr \, ds.$$

Denoting by $\mu$ the $n$-dimensional Lebesgue measure we continue by estimating the volume of the intersection by the minimum of the volumes of the two sets. Then, we can use the equality of the volumes of the superlevel sets for the rearrangements:

$$= \int_0^\infty \int_0^\infty \mu\left(E_f(r)\cap E_g(s)\right) \, dr \, ds$$
$$\leq \int_0^\infty \int_0^\infty \min\left\{\mu(E_f(r)),\, \mu(E_g(s)) \right\} \, dr \, ds$$
$$= \int_0^\infty \int_0^\infty \min\left\{\mu(E_{f^*}(r)),\, \mu(E_{g^*}(s)) \right\} \, dr \, ds.$$

Now, we use that the superlevel sets $E_{f^*}(r)$ and $E_{g^*}(s)$ are balls in $\mathbb R^n$ centered at $x=0$, which implies that $E_{f^*}(r) \, \cap\, E_{g^*}(s)$ is exactly the smaller one of the two balls:

$$= \int_0^\infty \int_0^\infty \mu\left( E_{f^*}(r)  \cap E_{g^*}(s) \right) \, dr \, ds$$
$$= \int_{\mathbb{R}^n} f^*(x)g^*(x) \, dx$$

The last identity follows by reversing the initial five steps that even work for general functions. This finishes the proof.

== See also ==
- Rearrangement inequality
- Chebyshev's sum inequality
- Lorentz space
