= Eilenberg's inequality =

Eilenberg's inequality, also known as the coarea inequality, is a mathematical inequality for Lipschitz-continuous functions between metric spaces. Informally, it gives an upper bound on the average size of the fibers of a Lipschitz map in terms of the Lipschitz constant of the function and the measure of the domain.

The Eilenberg's inequality has applications in geometric measure theory and manifold theory. It is also a key ingredient in the proof of the coarea formula.

== Formal statement ==
Let ƒ : X → Y be a Lipschitz-continuous function between metric spaces whose Lipschitz constant is denoted by Lip ƒ. Let s and t be nonnegative real numbers. Then, Eilenberg's inequality states that

$$\int_Y^* H^{s}(f^{-1}(y) \cap A) \, dH^t(y) \leq \frac{v_{s}v_t}{v_{s+t}}(\text{Lip }f)^t H^{s+t}(A),$$

for any A ⊂ X.

- the asterisk denotes the upper integral,
- v_{t} are universal constants. If t=n, then v_{t} equals the volume of the unit ball in R^{n},
- H^{t} is the t-dimensional Hausdorff measure.

The use of upper integral is necessary because in general the function $\ y \mapsto H^{s}(A\cap f^{-1}(y))$ may fail to be H^{t} measurable.

== History ==
The inequality was first proved by Eilenberg in 1938 for the case when the function was the distance to a fixed point in the metric space. Then it was generalized in 1943 by Eilenberg and Harold to the case of any real-valued Lipschitz function on a metric space.

The inequality in the form above was proved by Federer in 1954, except that he could prove it only under additional assumptions that he conjectured were unnecessary. Years later, Davies proved some deep results about Hausdorff contents and this conjecture was proved as a consequence. But recently a new proof, independent of Davies's result, has been found as well.

== About the proof ==
In many texts the inequality is proved for the case where the target space is a Euclidean space or a manifold. This is because the isodiametric inequality is available (locally in the case of manifolds), which allows for a straightforward proof. The isodiametric inequality is not available in general metric spaces. The proof of Eilenberg's inequality in the general case is quite involved and requires the notion of the so-called weighted integrals.
