= Three spheres inequality =

In mathematics, the three spheres inequality bounds the $L^2$ norm of an harmonic function on a given sphere in terms of the $L^2$ norm of this function on two spheres, one with bigger radius and one with smaller radius.

== Statement of the three spheres inequality ==
Let $u$ be an harmonic function on $\mathbb R^n$. Then for all $0 < r_1 < r <r_2$ one has

$$\| u \|_{L^2(S_r)} \leq \| u \|^\alpha_{L^2(S_{r_1})} \| u \|^{1-\alpha}_{L^2(S_{r_2})}$$

where $S_\rho := \{ x \in \mathbb R^n \colon \vert x \vert = \rho\}$ for $\rho>0$ is the sphere of radius $\rho$ centred at the origin and where

$$\alpha:=\frac{\log(r_2/r)}{\log(r_2/r_1)}.$$

Here we use the following normalisation for the $L^2$ norm:

$$\| u \|^2_{L^2(S_\rho)} := \rho^{1-n} \int_{\mathbb S^{n-1}} \vert u(\rho \hat x) \vert^2\, d\sigma(\hat x).$$
