= Weyl's inequality =

Inequalities in number theory and matrix theory

In linear algebra, Weyl's inequality is a theorem about the changes to eigenvalues of a Hermitian matrix that is perturbed. It can be used to estimate the eigenvalues of a perturbed Hermitian matrix.

== Weyl's inequality about perturbation ==
Let $A,B$ be Hermitian on inner product space $V$ with dimension $n$, with spectrum ordered in descending order $\lambda_1 \geq ... \geq \lambda_n$. Note that these eigenvalues can be ordered, because they are real (as eigenvalues of Hermitian matrices).

Weyl inequality—Let $A,B$ be $n\times n$ Hermitian matrices, and let $1 \leq i,j \le n$ be integers. If $i+j \leq n+1$, then
$$\lambda_{i+j-1}(A+B) \leq \lambda_i(A)+\lambda_j(B).$$
If $n < i+j$, then
$$\lambda_i(A)+\lambda_j(B) \leq \lambda_{i+j-n}(A+B).$$

Proof

By the min-max theorem, it suffices to show that any $W \subset V$ with dimension $i+j-1$, there exists a unit vector $w$ such that $\langle w, (A+B)w\rangle \leq \lambda_i(A) + \lambda_j(B)$.

By the min-max principle, there exists some $W_A$ with codimension $(i-1)$, such that
$$\lambda_i(A) = \max_{x\in W_A; \|x\|=1}\langle x, Ax\rangle$$
Similarly, there exists such a $W_B$ with codimension $j-1$. Now $W_A \cap W_B$ has codimension $\leq i+j-2$, so it has nontrivial intersection with $W$. Let $w \in W \cap W_A \cap W_B$, and we have the desired vector.

The second one is a corollary of the first, by taking the negative.

Weyl's inequality states that the spectrum of Hermitian matrices is stable under perturbation. Specifically, we have:

Corollary (Spectral stability)—
$$\lambda_k(A+B) - \lambda_k(A) \in [\lambda_n(B), \lambda_1(B)]$$
$$|\lambda_k(A+B) - \lambda_k(A)| \leq \|B\|_{op}$$
where
$$\|B\|_{op} = \max(|\lambda_1(B)|, |\lambda_n(B)|)$$
is the operator norm.

In jargon, it says that $\lambda_k$ is Lipschitz-continuous on the space of Hermitian matrices with operator norm.

== Weyl's inequality between eigenvalues and singular values ==
Let $A \in \mathbb{C}^{n \times n}$ have singular values $\sigma_1(A) \geq \cdots \geq \sigma_n(A) \geq 0$ and eigenvalues ordered so that $|\lambda_1(A)| \geq \cdots \geq |\lambda_n(A)|$. Then

$$|\lambda_1(A) \cdots \lambda_k(A)| \leq \sigma_1(A) \cdots \sigma_k(A)$$

For $k = 1, \ldots, n$, with equality for $k=n$.

== Applications ==
=== Estimating perturbations of the spectrum ===
Let Hermitian matrices $M$ and $N$ differ by a matrix $R$. Assume that $R$ is small in the sense that its spectral norm satisfies $\|R\|_2 \le \epsilon$ for some small $\epsilon>0$. Then it follows that all the eigenvalues of $R$ are bounded in absolute value by $\epsilon$. Applying Weyl's inequality, it follows that the spectra of the Hermitian matrices M and N are close in the sense that

$$|\mu_i - \nu_i| \le \epsilon \qquad \forall i=1,\ldots,n.$$

Note, however, that this eigenvalue perturbation bound is generally false for non-Hermitian matrices (or more accurately, for non-normal matrices). For a counterexample, let $t>0$ be arbitrarily small, and consider

$$M = \begin{bmatrix} 0 & 0 \\ 1/t^2 & 0 \end{bmatrix}, \qquad N = M + R = \begin{bmatrix} 0 & 1 \\ 1/t^2 & 0 \end{bmatrix}, \qquad R = \begin{bmatrix} 0 & 1 \\ 0 & 0 \end{bmatrix}.$$

whose eigenvalues $\mu_1 = \mu_2 = 0$ and $\nu_1 = +1/t, \nu_2 = -1/t$ do not satisfy $|\mu_i - \nu_i| \le \|R\|_2 = 1$.

=== Weyl's inequality for singular values ===
Let $M$ be a $p \times n$ matrix with $1 \le p \le n$. Its singular values $\sigma_k(M)$ are the $p$ positive eigenvalues of the $(p+n) \times (p+n)$ Hermitian augmented matrix

$$\begin{bmatrix} 0 & M \\ M^* & 0 \end{bmatrix}.$$

Therefore, Weyl's eigenvalue perturbation inequality for Hermitian matrices extends naturally to perturbation of singular values. This result gives the bound for the perturbation in the singular values of a matrix $M$ due to an additive perturbation $\Delta$:

$$|\sigma_k(M+\Delta) - \sigma_k(M)| \le \sigma_1(\Delta)$$

where we note that the largest singular value $\sigma_1(\Delta)$ coincides with the spectral norm $\|\Delta\|_2$.
