= Vysochanskij–Petunin inequality =

In probability theory, the Vysochanskij–Petunin inequality gives a lower bound for the probability that a random variable with finite variance lies within a certain number of standard deviations of the variable's mean, or equivalently an upper bound for the probability that it lies further away. The sole restrictions on the distribution are that it be unimodal and have finite variance; here unimodal implies that it is a continuous probability distribution except at the mode, which may have a non-zero probability.

== Theorem ==
Let $X$ be a random variable with unimodal distribution and finite variance, and $\alpha\in \mathbb R$. If we define $\rho=\sqrt{\mathbb E[(X-\alpha)^2]}$ then for any $r>0$,

$$\begin{align}
\operatorname{Pr}(|X-\alpha|\ge r)\le \begin{cases}
\frac{4\rho^2}{9r^2}&r\ge \sqrt{8/3}\rho \\
\frac{4\rho^2}{3r^2}-\frac{1}{3}&r\le \sqrt{8/3}\rho. \\
\end{cases}
\end{align}$$

=== Relation to Gauss's inequality ===
Taking $\alpha$ equal to a mode of $X$ yields the first case of Gauss's inequality.

=== Tightness of Bound ===
Without loss of generality, assume $\alpha=0$ and $\rho=1$.

- If $r<1$, the left-hand side can equal one, so the bound is useless.
- If $r\ge \sqrt{8/3}$, the bound is tight when $X=0$ with probability $1-\frac{4}{3r^2}$ and is otherwise distributed uniformly in the interval $\left[-\frac{3r}{2},\frac{3r}{2}\right]$.
- If $1\le r\le \sqrt{8/3}$, the bound is tight when $X=r$ with probability $\frac{4}{3r^2}-\frac{1}{3}$ and is otherwise distributed uniformly in the interval $\left[-\frac{r}{2},r\right]$.

=== Specialization to mean and variance ===
If $X$ has mean $\mu$ and finite, non-zero variance $\sigma^2$, then taking $\alpha=\mu$ and $r=\lambda \sigma$ gives that for any $\lambda > \sqrt{\frac{8}{3}} = 1.63299...,$

$$\operatorname{Pr}(\left|X-\mu\right|\geq \lambda\sigma)\leq\frac{4}{9\lambda^2}.$$

=== Proof Sketch ===
For a relatively elementary proof see. The rough idea behind the proof is that there are two cases: one where the mode of $X$ is close to $\alpha$ compared to $r$, in which case we can show $\operatorname{Pr}(|X-\alpha|\ge r)\le \frac{4\rho^2}{9r^2}$, and one where the mode of $X$ is far from $\alpha$ compared to $r$, in which case we can show $\operatorname{Pr}(|X-\alpha|\ge r)\le \frac{4\rho^2}{3r^2}-\frac{1}{3}$. Combining these two cases gives $\operatorname{Pr}(|X-\alpha|\ge r)\le \max\left(\frac{4\rho^2}{9r^2},\frac{4\rho^2}{3r^2}-\frac{1}{3}\right).$ When $\frac{r}{\rho}=\sqrt{\frac{8}{3}}$, the two cases give the same value.

== Properties ==
The theorem refines Chebyshev's inequality by including the factor of 4/9, made possible by the condition that the distribution be unimodal.

It is common, in the construction of control charts and other statistical heuristics, to set λ = 3, corresponding to an upper probability bound of 4/81= 0.04938..., and to construct 3-sigma limits to bound nearly all (i.e. 95%) of the values of a process output. Without unimodality Chebyshev's inequality would give a looser bound of 1/9 = 0.11111....

== One-sided version ==
A version of the Vysochanskij-Petunin inequality for one-sided tail bounds exists. For a unimodal random variable $X$ with mean $\mu$ and variance $\sigma^2$, and $r \geq 0$, a one-sided Vysochanskij-Petunin inequality derived by Mercadier and Strobel (2021) confirming a result from Bottomley (2001) holds as follows:

$$\mathbb{P}(X-\mu\geq r)\leq
\begin{cases}
\dfrac{4}{9}\dfrac{\sigma^2}{r^{2}+\sigma^2} & \mbox{for }r^{2}\geq\dfrac{5}{3}\sigma^2,\\
\dfrac{4}{3}\dfrac{\sigma^2}{r^{2}+\sigma^2}-\dfrac{1}{3} & \mbox{otherwise.}
\end{cases}$$

The above Mercadier-Strobel inequality, as well as the related Cantelli inequality, can for instance be relevant in the financial area, in the sense of "how bad can losses get".

=== Proof ===
The proof is very similar to that of Cantelli's inequality. For any $u\ge 0$,

$$\begin{align}
\mathbb{P}(X-\mu\geq r)&=\mathbb{P}((X+u)-\mu\geq r+u)\\
&\le \mathbb{P}(|(X+u)-\mu)|\geq r+u).\\
\end{align}$$

Then we can apply the Vysochanskij-Petunin inequality. With $\rho^2=\mathbb E[((X+u)-\mu)^2]=u^2+\sigma^2$, we have:

$$\begin{align}
\mathbb{P}(|(X+u)-\mu)|\geq r+u) &\le \begin{cases}
\frac{4}{9} \frac{\rho^2}{(r+u)^2} & r+u\ge \sqrt{8/3}\rho\\
\frac{4}{3} \frac{\rho^2}{(r+u)^2}-\frac{1}{3} & r+u\le \sqrt{8/3}\rho
\end{cases}.
\end{align}$$

As in the proof of Cantelli's inequality, it can be shown that the minimum of $\frac{\rho^2}{(r+u)^2}$ over all $u\ge 0$ is achieved at $u=\sigma^2/r$. Plugging in this value of $u$ and simplifying yields the desired inequality.

== Generalisation ==
Dharmadhikari and Joag-Dev generalised the VP inequality to deviations from an arbitrary point and moments of order $k$ other than $2$

$$\begin{align}
P(|X-\alpha| \geq r) \leq \max \left\{\frac{s \tau_k-r^k}{(s-1) r^k},\left[\frac{k}{k+1}\right]^k \frac{\tau_k}{r^k}\right\} \\
\end{align}$$

where

$$\begin{align}
\tau_k=E\left(|X-\alpha|^k\right), s>(k+1),  s(s-k-1)^k=k^k
\end{align}$$

The standard form of the inequality can be recovered by setting $k = 2$ which leads to a unique value of $s = 4$.

== See also ==
- Gauss's inequality, a similar result for the distance from the mode rather than the mean
- Rule of three (statistics), a similar result for the Bernoulli distribution
