= Unimodal thresholding =

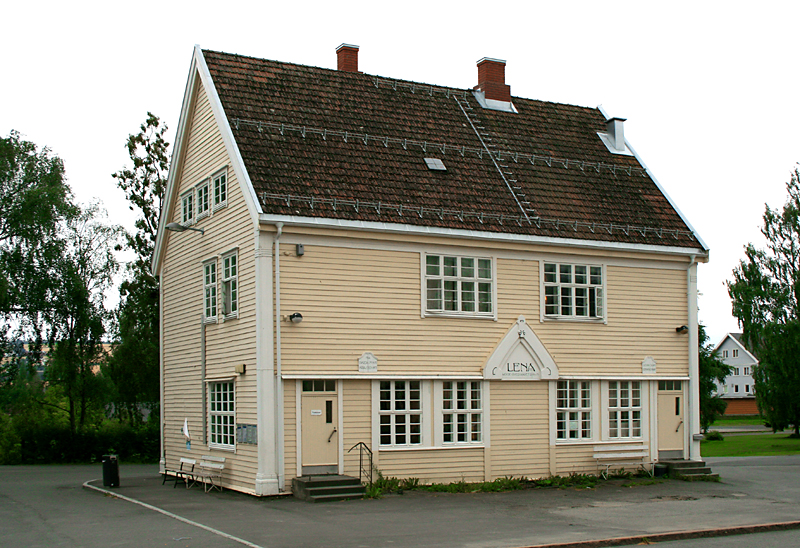
Original image

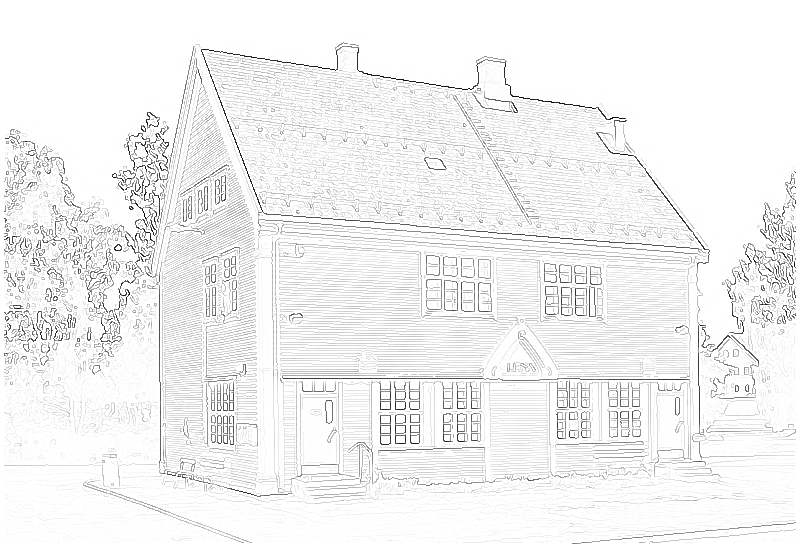
Edge map (inverted)

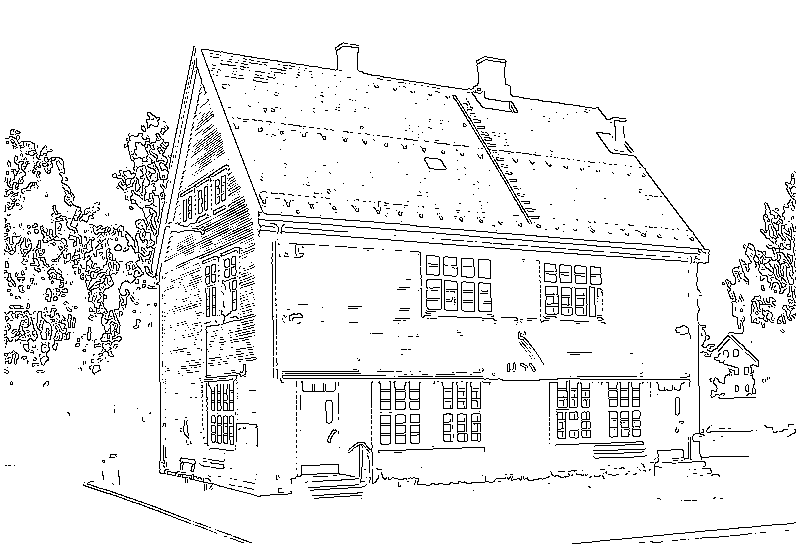
Thresholded edge map using Otsu's algorithm

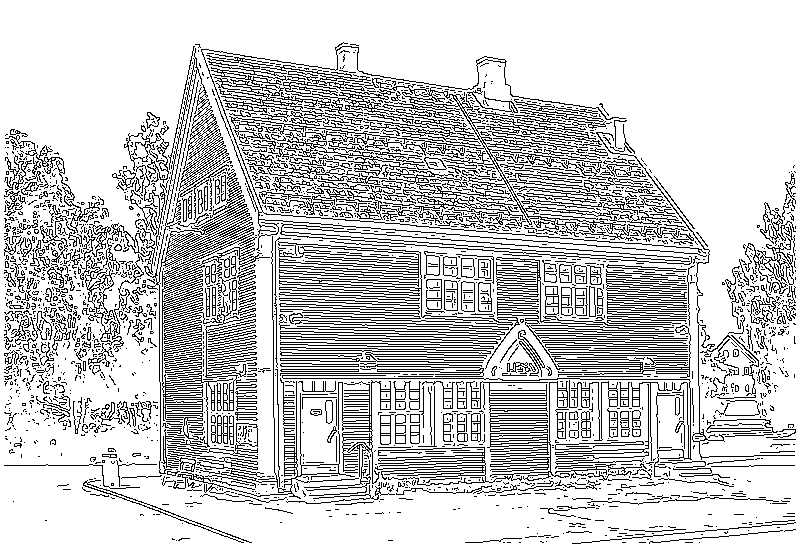
Thresholded edge map using Rosin's algorithm

Unimodal thresholding is an algorithm for automatic image threshold selection in image processing. Most threshold selection algorithms assume that the intensity histogram is multi-modal; typically bimodal. However, some types of images are essentially unimodal since a much larger proportion of just one class of pixels (e.g. the background) is present in the image, and dominates the histogram. In such circumstances many of the standard threshold selection algorithms will fail. However, a few algorithms have been designed to specifically cope with such images.

== Methods ==
Some examples of unimodal image threshold selection algorithms are

- "T-point algorithm: the tail of the histogram is fitted by two line segments, and the threshold is selected at their intersection
- maximum deviation algorithm: a straight line is drawn from the histogram peak to the end of the tail, and the threshold is selected at the point of the histogram furthest from the straight line
- Rayleigh distribution model algorithm: the mode (peak) is assumed to correspond to noise. The user specifies an allowable proportion of noise from which the threshold is determined using the model
