= U-quadratic distribution =

Continuous probability distribution

U-quadratic
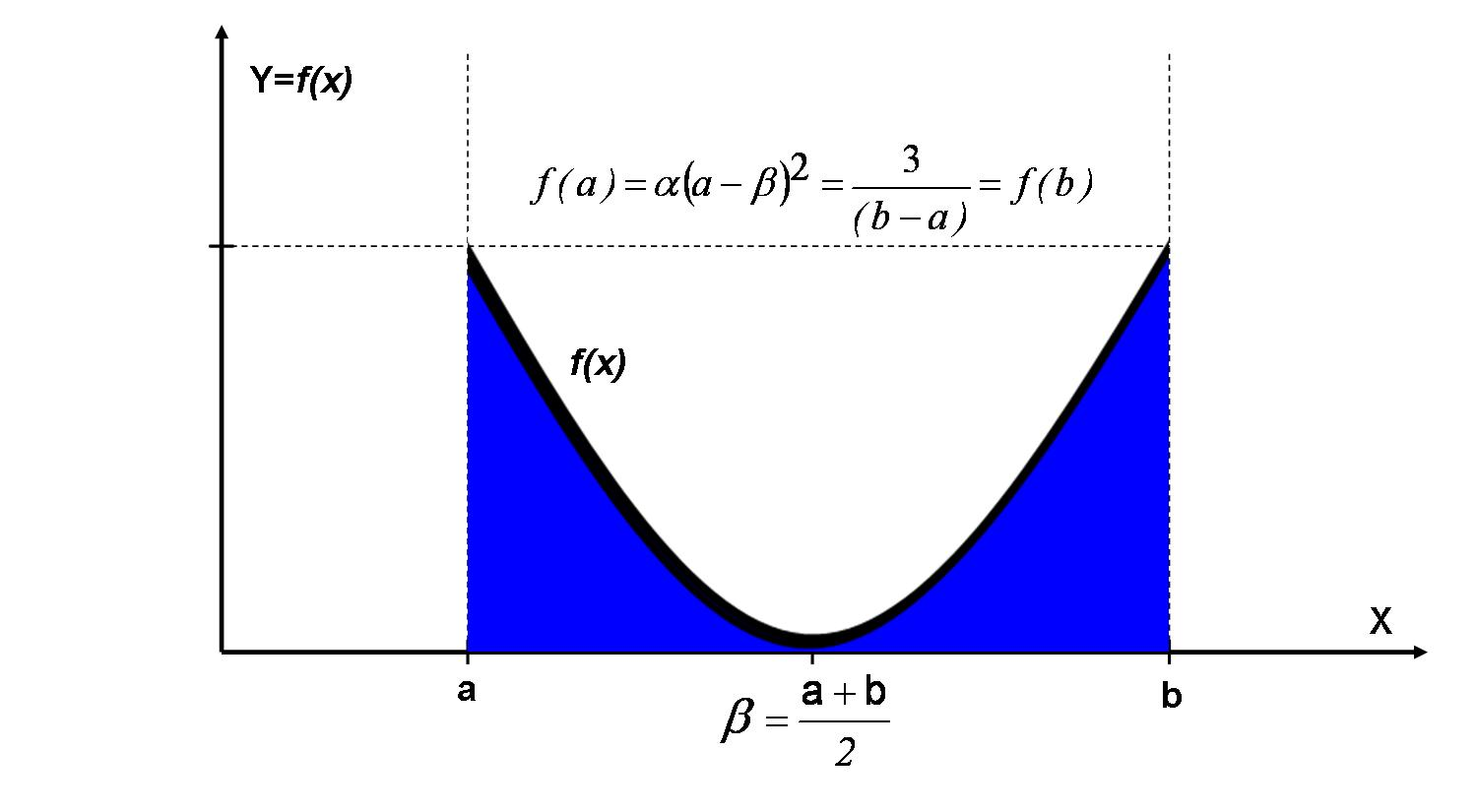
- Probability density function
- Parameters: $a:~a \in (-\infty,\infty)$ $b:~b \in (a, \infty)$ or $\alpha:~\alpha\in (0,\infty)$ $\beta:~\beta \in (-\infty,\infty),$
- Support: $x\in [a , b]\!$
- PDF: $\alpha \left ( x - \beta \right )^2$
- CDF: ${\alpha \over 3} \left ( (x - \beta)^3 + (\beta - a)^3 \right )$
- Mean: ${a+b \over 2}$
- Median: ${a+b \over 2}$
- Mode: $a\text{ and }b$
- Variance: ${3 \over 20} (b-a)^2$
- Skewness: $0$
- Excess kurtosis: $-{38 \over 21}$
- Entropy: $\log\left(\frac{e^{2 \over 3}(b-a)}{3} \right)$
- MGF: See text
- CF: See text

In probability theory and statistics, the U-quadratic distribution is a continuous probability distribution defined by a unique convex quadratic function with lower limit a and upper limit b.

$$f(x|a,b,\alpha, \beta)=\alpha \left ( x - \beta \right )^2, \quad\text{for } x \in [a , b].$$

== Parameter relations ==
This distribution has effectively only two parameters a, b, as the other two are explicit functions of the support defined by the former two parameters:

$$\beta = {b+a \over 2}$$

(gravitational balance center, offset), and

$$\alpha = {12 \over \left ( b-a \right )^3}$$

(vertical scale).

== Related distributions ==
One can introduce a vertically inverted ($\cap$)-quadratic distribution in analogous fashion. That inverted distribution is also closely related to the Epanechnikov distribution.

== Applications ==
This distribution is a useful model for symmetric bimodal processes. Other continuous distributions allow more flexibility, in terms of relaxing the symmetry and the quadratic shape of the density function, which are enforced in the U-quadratic distribution – e.g., beta distribution and gamma distribution.

== Moment generating function ==
$$M_X(t) = {-3\left(e^{at}(4+(a^2+2a(-2+b)+b^2)t)- e^{bt} (4 + (-4b + (a+b)^2)t)\right) \over (a-b)^3 t^2 }$$

== Characteristic function ==
$$\phi_X(t) = {3i\left(e^{iate^{ibt}} (4i - (-4b + (a+b)^2)t)\right) \over (a-b)^3 t^2 }$$
