= Turning point test =

Statistical test

In statistical hypothesis testing, a turning point test is a statistical test of the independence of a series of random variables. Maurice Kendall and Alan Stuart describe the test as "reasonable for a test against cyclicity but poor as a test against trend." The test was first published by Irénée-Jules Bienaymé in 1874.

== Statement of test ==
The turning point test is a test of the null hypothesis

H_{0}: X_{1}, X_{2}, ..., X_{n} are independent and identically distributed random variables (iid)

against

H_{1}: X_{1}, X_{2}, ..., X_{n} are not iid.

This test assumes that the X_{i} have a continuous distribution (so adjacent values are almost surely never equal).

=== Test statistic ===
We say i is a turning point if the vector X_{1}, X_{2}, ..., X_{i}, ..., X_{n} is not monotonic at index i. The number of turning points is the number of maxima and minima in the series.

Letting T be the number of turning points, then for large n, T is approximately normally distributed with mean (2n − 4)/3 and variance (16n − 29)/90. The test statistic

$$z =\frac{T - \frac{2n-4}{3}}{\sqrt{\frac{16n-29}{90}}}$$

is approximately standard normal for large values of n.

== Applications ==
The test can be used to verify the accuracy of a fitted time series model such as that describing irrigation requirements.
