= Multidimensional Chebyshev's inequality =

In probability theory, the multidimensional Chebyshev's inequality is a generalization of Chebyshev's inequality, which puts a bound on the probability of the event that a random variable differs from its expected value by more than a specified amount.

Let $X$ be an $N$-dimensional random vector with expected value $\mu=\operatorname{E}[X]$ and covariance matrix

$$V=\operatorname{E} [(X - \mu) (X - \mu)^T]. \,$$

If $V$ is a positive-definite matrix, for any real number $t>0$:

$$\Pr \left( \sqrt{( X-\mu)^T  V^{-1} (X-\mu) } > t\right) \le \frac N {t^2}$$

== Proof ==
Since $V$ is positive-definite and symmetric, so is $V^{-1}$. Define the random variable

$$y = (X-\mu)^T V^{-1} (X-\mu).$$

Since $y$ is positive, Markov's inequality holds:

$$\Pr\left( \sqrt{(X-\mu)^T V^{-1} (X-\mu) } > t\right) = \Pr( \sqrt{y} > t) = \Pr(y > t^2)
\le \frac{\operatorname{E}[y]}{t^2}.$$

Finally,

$$\begin{align}
\operatorname{E}[y] &= \operatorname{E}[(X-\mu)^T V^{-1} (X-\mu)]\\[6pt]
&=\operatorname{E}[ \operatorname{trace} (  V^{-1} (X-\mu) (X-\mu)^T )]\\[6pt]
&= \operatorname{trace} (  V^{-1} V ) = N
\end{align}.$$

== Infinite dimensions ==
There is a straightforward extension of the vector version of Chebyshev's inequality to infinite dimensional settings^{[more refs. needed]}. Let X be a random variable which takes values in a Fréchet space $\mathcal X$ (equipped with seminorms || ⋅ ||_{α}). This includes most common settings of vector-valued random variables, e.g., when $\mathcal X$ is a Banach space (equipped with a single norm), a Hilbert space, or the finite-dimensional setting as described above.

Suppose that X is of "strong order two", meaning that

$$\operatorname{E}\left(\| X\|_\alpha^2 \right) < \infty$$

for every seminorm || ⋅ ||_{α}. This is a generalization of the requirement that X have finite variance, and is necessary for this strong form of Chebyshev's inequality in infinite dimensions. The terminology "strong order two" is due to Vakhania.

Let $\mu \in \mathcal X$ be the Pettis integral of X (i.e., the vector generalization of the mean), and let

$$\sigma_a := \sqrt{\operatorname{E}\|X - \mu\|_\alpha^2}$$

be the standard deviation with respect to the seminorm || ⋅ ||_{α}. In this setting we can state the following:

General version of Chebyshev's inequality. $\forall k > 0: \quad \Pr\left( \|X - \mu\|_\alpha \ge k \sigma_\alpha \right) \le \frac{1}{ k^2 }.$

Proof. The proof is straightforward, and essentially the same as the finitary version^{[source needed]}. If σ_{α} = 0, then X is constant (and equal to μ) almost surely, so the inequality is trivial.

If

$$\|X - \mu\|_\alpha \ge k \sigma_\alpha$$

then ||X − μ||_{α} > 0, so we may safely divide by ||X − μ||_{α}. The crucial trick in Chebyshev's inequality is to recognize that $1 = \tfrac{\|X - \mu\|_\alpha^2}{\|X - \mu\|_\alpha^2}$.

The following calculations complete the proof:

$$\begin{align}
\Pr\left( \|X - \mu\|_\alpha \ge k \sigma_\alpha \right) &= \int_\Omega \mathbf{1}_{\|X - \mu\|_\alpha \ge k \sigma_\alpha} \, \mathrm d\Pr \\
& = \int_\Omega \left ( \frac{\|X - \mu\|_\alpha^2}{\|X - \mu\|_\alpha^2} \right ) \cdot \mathbf{1}_{\|X - \mu\|_\alpha \ge k \sigma_\alpha} \, \mathrm d\Pr \\[6pt]
&\le \int_\Omega \left (\frac{\|X - \mu\|_\alpha^2}{(k\sigma_\alpha)^2} \right ) \cdot \mathbf{1}_{\|X - \mu\|_\alpha \ge k \sigma_\alpha} \, \mathrm d\Pr \\[6pt]
&\le \frac{1}{k^2 \sigma_\alpha^2} \int_\Omega \|X - \mu\|_\alpha^2 \, \mathrm d\Pr && \mathbf{1}_{\|X - \mu\|_\alpha \ge k \sigma_\alpha} \le 1\\[6pt]
&= \frac{1}{k^2 \sigma_\alpha^2} \left (\operatorname{E}\|X - \mu\|_\alpha^2 \right )\\[6pt]
&= \frac{1}{k^2 \sigma_\alpha^2} \left (\sigma_\alpha^2 \right )\\[6pt]
&= \frac{1}{k^2}
\end{align}$$
