= Yuri Petunin =

Soviet and Ukrainian mathematician

Yuri Ivanovich Petunin
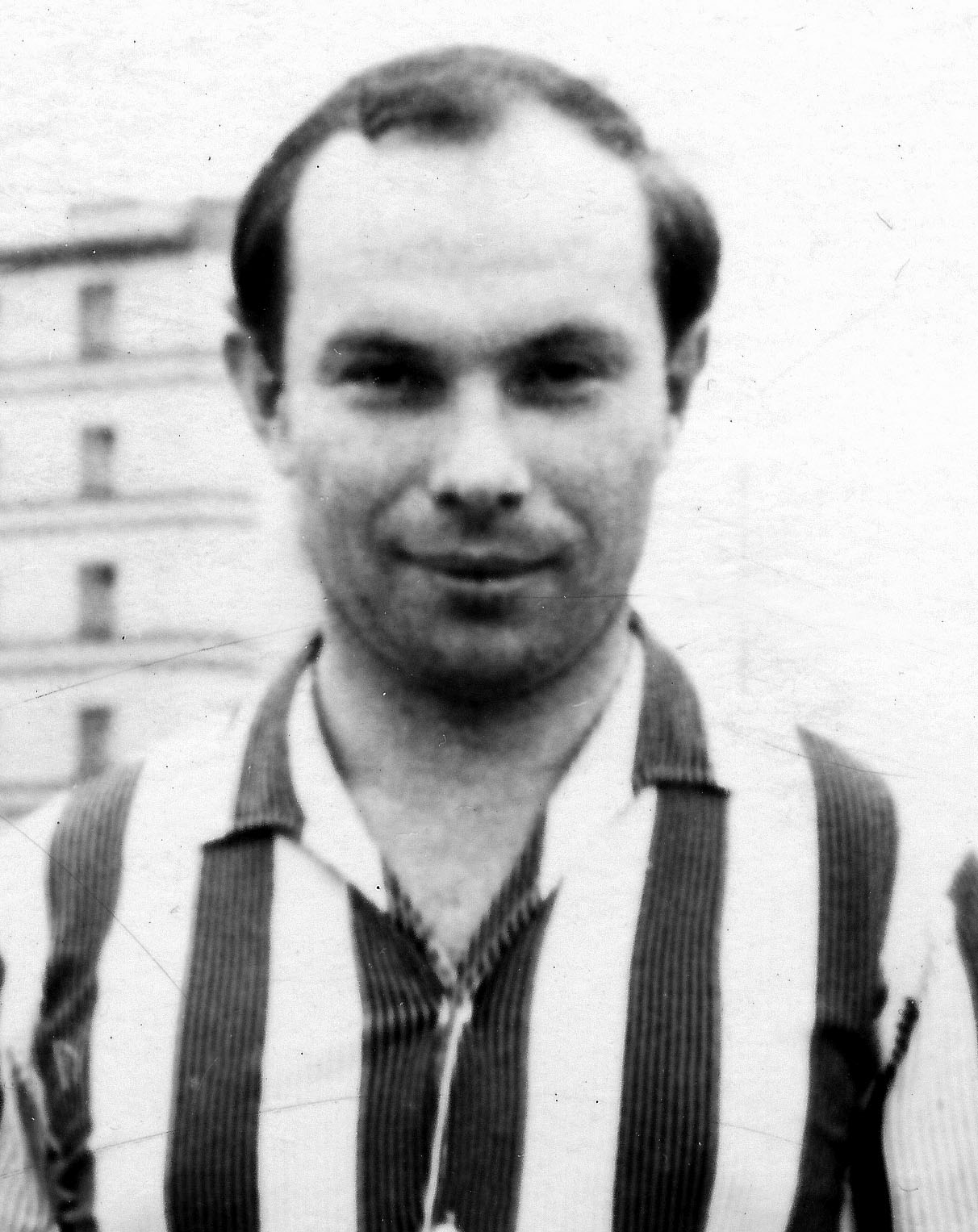
- Born: September 30, 1937; Michurinsk, Tambov Oblast, USSR
- Died: June 1, 2011 (aged 73); Kyiv, Ukraine
- Known for: Functional analysis, Mathematical statistics, Biology
- Scientific career
- Fields: Mathematician
- Workplaces: Kyiv State University
- Doctoral advisor: Selim Krein

Yuri Ivanovich Petunin (Russian: Юрий Иванович Петунин) was a Soviet and Ukrainian mathematician. Petunin was born in the city of Michurinsk (USSR) on September 30, 1937. After graduating from the Tambov State Pedagogical Institute he began his studies at Voronezh State University under the supervision of S. G. Krein. He completed his postgraduate studies in 1962, and in 1968 he received his Doctor of Science Degree, the highest scientific degree awarded in the Soviet Union. In 1970 he joined the faculty of the computational mathematics department at Kyiv State University.

Yuri Petunin is highly regarded for his results in functional analysis. He developed the theory of Scales in Banach spaces, the theory of characteristics of linear manifolds in conjugate Banach spaces, and with S. G. Krein and E. M. Semenov contributed to the theory of interpolation of linear operators. He solved Banach's problem of norming subspaces in conjugate Banach spaces as well as a problem posted by Calderón and Lions concerning interpolation in factor spaces.

In addition to his work in functional analysis, Professor Petunin made significant contributions to pattern recognition and mathematical statistics. He also worked on developing differential diagnostics for oncological disease. The Vysochanskij–Petunin inequality that bears his name formally justifies the so-called 3-sigma rule for unimodal distributions, a rule that has been broadly used in statistics since the time of Gauss. In the area of pattern recognition he developed a theory of linear discriminant rules where he investigated the problems of linear separability of any number of sets in n-dimensional space.

In his later years Yuri Petunin returned to the area of functional analysis where he had begun his scientific research. Together with his colleagues at the department of computational mathematics, he successfully worked toward a solution of Hilbert's 20th problem.

== See also ==
- Vysochanskii–Petunin inequality
