= Francesco Paolo Cantelli =

Italian mathematician (1875–1966)

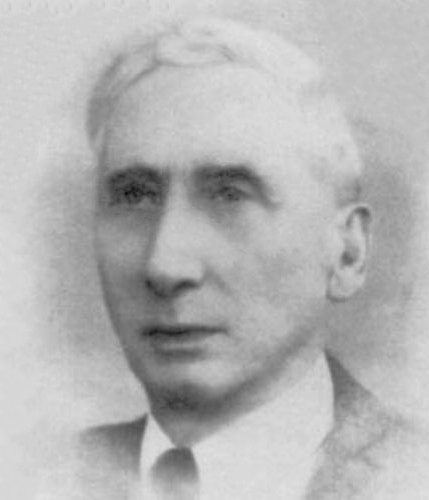
- Francesco Cantelli
- Born: December 20, 1875; Palermo, Italy
- Died: July 21, 1966 (aged 90); Rome, Italy
- Education: University of Palermo
- Known for: Borel–Cantelli lemma Glivenko–Cantelli theorem Cantelli's inequality
- Scientific career
- Workplaces: Palermo Astronomical Observatory; Cassa Depositi e Prestiti; University of Catania; University of Naples; Sapienza University of Rome
- Doctoral advisor: Filippo Angelitti

Francesco Paolo Cantelli (20 December 1875 – 21 July 1966) was an Italian mathematician. He made contributions to celestial mechanics, probability theory, and actuarial science.

== Biography ==
Cantelli was born in Palermo. He received his doctorate in mathematics in 1899 from the University of Palermo with a thesis on celestial mechanics and continued his interest in astronomy by working until 1903 at Palermo Astronomical Observatory (osservatorio astronomico cittadino), which was under the direction of Annibale Riccò. Cantelli's early papers were on problems in astronomy and celestial mechanics.

From 1903 to 1923 Cantelli worked at the Istituto di Previdenza della Cassa Depositi e Prestiti (Pension Fund for the Government Deposits and Loans Bank). During these years he did research on the mathematics of finance theory and actuarial science, as well as the probability theory. Cantelli's later work was all on probability theory. Borel–Cantelli lemma, Cantelli's inequality and the Glivenko–Cantelli theorem are result of his work in this field. In 1916–1917 he made contributions to the theory of stochastic convergence. In 1923 he resigned his actuarial position when he was appointed professor of actuarial mathematics at the University of Catania. From there, he went to the University of Naples, where he worked as a professor and then in 1931 to the Sapienza University of Rome where he remained until his retirement in 1951. He died in Rome.

Cantelli made fundamental contributions to the foundations of probability theory and to the clarification of different types of probabilistic convergence. He also made seminal contributions to actuarial science. He was the founder of the Istituto Italiano degli Attuari for the applications of mathematics and probability to economics. Cantelli was the editor of the Giornale dell'Istituto Italiano degli Attuari (GIIA) from 1930 to 1958.

== Works ==
- Sull'adattamento delle curve ad una serie di misure o di osservazioni, Palermo, 1905
- Genesi e costruzione delle tavole di mutualità, 1914
- Sulla legge dei grandi numeri, 1916
- La tendenza a un limite nel senso del calcolo delle probabilità, 1916
- Sulla probabilità come limite della frequenza in "Rendiconti della Reale Accademia dei Lincei", 1917
- Una teoria astratta del calcolo delle probabilità, GIIA, vol. 3, pp. 257–265, Roma, 1932
- Considerazioni sulla legge uniforme dei grandi numeri e sulla generalizzazione di un fondamentale teorema del Sig. Paul Levy, 1933
- Sulla determinazione empirica delle leggi di probabilità, 1933
- Su una teoria astratta del calcolo delle probabilità e sulla sua applicazione al teorema detto "delle probabilità zero e uno", 1939

== See also ==
- Cantelli's inequality
- Borel–Cantelli lemma
- Glivenko–Cantelli theorem
