= Lenglart's inequality =

Mathematical Inequality

In the mathematical theory of probability, Lenglart's inequality was proved by Érik Lenglart in 1977. Later slight modifications are also called Lenglart's inequality.

== Statement ==
Let X be a non-negative right-continuous $\mathcal{F}_t$-adapted process and let G be a non-negative right-continuous non-decreasing predictable process such that $\mathbb{E}[X(\tau)\mid \mathcal{F}_0]\leq \mathbb{E}[G(\tau)\mid \mathcal{F}_0]< \infty$ for any bounded stopping time $\tau$. Then

1. $\forall c,d>0, \mathbb{P}\left(\sup_{t\geq 0}X(t)>c\,\Big\vert\mathcal{F}_0\right)\leq \frac{1}{c}\mathbb{E} \left[\sup_{t\geq 0}G(t)\wedge d\,\Big\vert\mathcal{F}_0\right]+\mathbb{P}\left(\sup_{t\geq 0}G(t)\geq d\,\Big\vert\mathcal{F}_0\right).$
2. $\forall p\in(0,1), \mathbb{E}\left[\left(\sup_{t\geq 0}X(t)\right)^p\Big\vert \mathcal{F}_0 \right]\leq c_p\mathbb{E}\left[\left(\sup_{t\geq 0}G(t)\right)^p\Big\vert \mathcal{F}_0\right], \text{ where } c_p:=\frac{p^{-p}}{1-p}.$
