= Eaton's inequality =

In probability theory, Eaton's inequality is a bound on the largest values of a linear combination of bounded random variables. This inequality was described in 1974 by Morris L. Eaton.

== Statement of the inequality ==
Let {X_{i}} be a set of real independent random variables, each with an expected value of zero and bounded above by 1 ( |X_{i} | ≤ 1, for 1 ≤ i ≤ n). The variates do not have to be identically or symmetrically distributed. Let {a_{i}} be a set of n fixed real numbers with

$$\sum_{ i = 1 }^n a_i^2 = 1 .$$

Eaton showed that

$$P\left( \left| \sum_{ i = 1 }^n a_i X_i \right| \ge k \right) \le 2 \inf_{ 0 \le c \le k } \int_c^\infty \left( \frac{ z - c }{ k - c } \right)^3 \phi( z ) \, dz = 2 B_E( k ) ,$$

where φ(x) is the probability density function of the standard normal distribution.

A related bound is Edelman's

$$P\left( \left| \sum_{ i = 1 }^n a_i X_i \right| \ge k \right) \le 2 \left( 1 - \Phi\left[ k - \frac{ 1.5 }{ k } \right] \right) = 2 B_{ Ed }( k ) ,$$

where Φ(x) is cumulative distribution function of the standard normal distribution.

Pinelis has shown that Eaton's bound can be sharpened:

$$B_{ EP } = \min\{ 1, k^{ -2 }, 2 B_E \}$$

A set of critical values for Eaton's bound have been determined.

== Related inequalities ==
Let {a_{i}} be a set of independent Rademacher random variables – P( a_{i} = 1 ) = P( a_{i} = −1 ) = 1/2. Let Z be a normally distributed variate with a mean 0 and variance of 1. Let {b_{i}} be a set of n fixed real numbers such that

$$\sum_{ i = 1 }^n b_i^2 = 1 .$$

This last condition is required by the Riesz–Fischer theorem which states that

$$a_i b_i + \cdots + a_n b_n$$

will converge if and only if

$$\sum_{ i = 1 }^n b_i^2$$

is finite.

Then

$$E f( a_i b_i + \cdots + a_n b_n ) \le E f( Z )$$

for f(x) = | x |^{p}. The case for p ≥ 3 was proved by Whittle and p ≥ 2 was proved by Haagerup.

If f(x) = e^{λx} with λ ≥ 0 then

$$E f( a_i b_i + \cdots + a_n b_n ) \le \inf \left[ \frac{ E ( e^{ \lambda Z  } ) }{ e^{ \lambda x } } \right] = e^{ -x^2 / 2 }$$

where inf is the infimum.

Let

$$S_n =  a_i b_i + \cdots + a_n b_n$$

Then

$$P( S_n \ge x ) \le \frac{ 2e^3 }{ 9 } P( Z \ge x )$$

The constant in the last inequality is approximately 4.4634.

An alternative bound is also known:

$$P( S_n \ge x ) \le e^{ -x^2 / 2 }$$

This last bound is related to the Hoeffding's inequality.

In the uniform case where all the b_{i} = n^{−1/2} the maximum value of S_{n} is n^{1/2}. In this case van Zuijlen has shown that

$P( | \mu - \sigma | ) \le 0.5 \,$

where μ is the mean and σ is the standard deviation of the sum.
