= Markov's inequality =

Concept in probability theory

Markov's inequality gives an upper bound for the measure of the set (indicated in red) where $f(x)$ exceeds a given level $\varepsilon$. The bound combines the level $\varepsilon$ with the average value of $f$.

In probability theory, Markov's inequality gives an upper bound on the probability that a non-negative random variable is greater than or equal to some positive constant. Markov's inequality is tight in the sense that for each chosen positive constant, there exists a random variable such that the inequality is in fact an equality.

It is named after the Russian mathematician Andrey Markov, although it appeared earlier in the work of Pafnuty Chebyshev (Markov's teacher), and many sources, especially in analysis, refer to it as Chebyshev's inequality (sometimes, calling it the first Chebyshev inequality, while referring to Chebyshev's inequality as the second Chebyshev inequality) or Bienaymé's inequality.

Markov's inequality (and other similar inequalities) relate probabilities to expectations, and provide (frequently loose but still useful) bounds for the cumulative distribution function of a random variable. Mitzenmacher and Upfal note that Markov's inequality "is often too weak to yield useful results, but it is still a fundamental tool in developing more sophisticated bounds".

Markov's inequality can also be used to upper bound the expectation of a non-negative random variable in terms of its distribution function.

== Statement ==
If X is a nonnegative random variable and a > 0, then the probability that X is at least a is at most the expectation of X divided by a:

$$\operatorname{P}(X \geq a) \leq \frac{\operatorname{E}(X)}{a}.$$

When $\operatorname{E}(X) > 0$, we can take $a = \tilde{a} \cdot \operatorname{E}(X)$ for $\tilde{a} > 0$ to rewrite the previous inequality as

$$\operatorname{P}(X \geq \tilde{a} \cdot \operatorname{E}(X)) \leq \frac{1}{\tilde{a}}.$$

In the language of measure theory, Markov's inequality states that if (X, Σ, μ) is a measure space, $f$ is a measurable extended real-valued function, and ε > 0, then

$$\mu(\{x\in X:|f(x)|\geq \varepsilon \}) \leq \frac 1 \varepsilon \int_X |f|\,d\mu.$$

This measure-theoretic definition is sometimes referred to as Chebyshev's inequality.

=== Extended version for nondecreasing functions ===
If φ is a nondecreasing nonnegative function, X is a (not necessarily nonnegative) random variable, and φ(a) > 0, then

$$\operatorname P (X \ge a) \le \frac{\operatorname E(\varphi(X))}{\varphi(a)}.$$

An immediate corollary, using higher moments of X supported on values larger than 0, is

$$\operatorname P (|X| \ge a) \le \frac{\operatorname E(|X|^n)}{a^n}.$$

The respective measure-theoretic versions are

$$\mu(\{x \in X : |f(x)| \geq \varepsilon\}) \leq \frac{1}{\varphi(\varepsilon)} \int_X \varphi(|f|).$$

and

$$\mu(\{x \in X : |f(x)| \geq \varepsilon\}) \leq \frac{1}{\varepsilon^p} \int_X |f|^p = \frac{1}{\varepsilon^p} \|f\|_{L^p}^p.$$

Where $\|\cdot\|_{L^p}$ denotes the Lp norm.

=== The uniformly randomized Markov's inequality ===
If X is a nonnegative random variable and a > 0, and U is a uniformly distributed random variable on $[0,1]$ that is independent of X, then

$$\operatorname{P}(X \geq Ua) \leq \frac{\operatorname{E}(X)}{a}.$$

Since U is almost surely smaller than one, this bound is strictly stronger than Markov's inequality. Remarkably, U cannot be replaced by any constant smaller than one, meaning that deterministic improvements to Markov's inequality cannot exist in general. While Markov's inequality holds with equality for distributions supported on $\{0,a\}$, the above randomized variant holds with equality for any distribution that is bounded on $[0,a]$.

== Proofs ==
We begin with the case for discrete random variables.

=== Discrete case ===
We now provide a proof for the special case when $X$ is a discrete random variable which only takes on non-negative integer values.

$E[X] = \sum_{i} i\,P(X=i) \;\geq\; \sum_{i \geq a} i\,P(X=i) \;\geq\; \sum_{i \geq a} a\,P(X=i) = a \sum_{i \geq a} P(X=i) = a\,P(X \geq a)$

Now we consider continuous random variables too. We separate the case in which the measure space is a probability space from the more general case because the probability case is more accessible for the general reader.

=== Intuition ===
$\operatorname{E}(X) = \operatorname{P}(X < a)\cdot \operatorname{E}(X|X<a) + \operatorname{P}(X \geq a)\cdot \operatorname{E}(X|X\geq a)$ where $\operatorname{E}(X|X<a)$ is larger than or equal to 0 as the random variable $X$ is non-negative and $\operatorname{E}(X|X\geq a)$ is larger than or equal to $a$ because the conditional expectation only takes into account of values larger than or equal to $a$ which r.v. $X$ can take.

Property 1: $\operatorname{P}(X < a) \cdot \operatorname{E}(X \mid X < a) \geq 0$

Given a non-negative random variable $X$, the conditional expectation $\operatorname{E}(X \mid X < a) \geq 0$ because $X \geq 0$. Also, probabilities are always non-negative, i.e., $\operatorname{P}(X < a) \geq 0$. Thus, the product:

$\operatorname{P}(X < a) \cdot \operatorname{E}(X \mid X < a) \geq 0$.

This is intuitive since conditioning on $X < a$ still results in non-negative values, ensuring the product remains non-negative.

Property 2: $\operatorname{P}(X \geq a) \cdot \operatorname{E}(X \mid X \geq a) \geq a \cdot \operatorname{P}(X \geq a)$

For $X \geq a$, the expected value given $X \geq a$ is at least $a. \operatorname{E}(X \mid X \geq a) \geq a$. Multiplying both sides by $\operatorname{P}(X \geq a)$, we get:

$\operatorname{P}(X \geq a) \cdot \operatorname{E}(X \mid X \geq a) \geq a \cdot \operatorname{P}(X \geq a)$.

This is intuitive since all values considered are at least $a$, making their average also greater than or equal to $a$.

Hence intuitively, $\operatorname{E}(X)\geq \operatorname{P}(X \geq a)\cdot \operatorname{E}(X|X\geq a)\geq a \cdot \operatorname{P}(X\geq a)$, which directly leads to $\operatorname{P}(X\geq a)\leq \frac{\operatorname{E}(X)}{a}$.

=== Probability-theoretic proof ===
Method 1: From the definition of expectation:

$$\operatorname{E}(X)=\int_{-\infty}^{\infty} xf(x) \, dx$$

However, $X$ is a non-negative random variable thus,

$$\operatorname{E}(X)=\int_{-\infty}^\infty xf(x) \, dx = \int_0^\infty xf(x) \, dx$$

From this we can derive,

$$\operatorname{E}(X)=\int_0^a xf(x) \, dx + \int_a^\infty xf(x) \, dx \ge  \int_a^\infty xf(x) \, dx \ge\int_a^\infty af(x) \, dx = a\int_a^\infty f(x) \, dx= a \operatorname{Pr}(X \ge a)$$

From here, dividing through by $a$ allows us to see that

$$\Pr(X \ge a) \le \operatorname{E}(X)/a$$

Method 2: For any event $E$, let $I_E$ be the indicator random variable of $E$, that is, $I_E=1$ if $E$ occurs and $I_E=0$ otherwise.

Using this notation, we have $I_{(X\geq a)}=1$ if the event $X\geq a$ occurs, and $I_{(X\geq a)}=0$ if $X<a$. Then, given $a>0$,

$$aI_{(X \geq a)} \leq X$$

which is clear if we consider the two possible values of $X\geq a$. If $X<a$, then $I_{(X\geq a)}=0$, and so $a I_{(X\geq a)}=0\leq X$. Otherwise, we have $X\geq a$, for which $I_{X\geq a}=1$ and so $aI_{X\geq a}=a\leq X$.

Since $\operatorname{E}$ is a monotonically increasing function, taking expectation of both sides of an inequality cannot reverse it. Therefore,

$$\operatorname{E}(aI_{(X \geq a)}) \leq \operatorname{E}(X).$$

Now, using linearity of expectations, the left side of this inequality is the same as

$$a\operatorname{E}(I_{(X \geq a)}) = a(1\cdot\operatorname{P}(X \geq a) + 0\cdot\operatorname{P}(X < a)) = a\operatorname{P}(X \geq a).$$

Thus we have

$$a\operatorname{P}(X \geq a) \leq \operatorname{E}(X)$$

and since a > 0, we can divide both sides by a.

=== Measure-theoretic proof ===
We may assume that the function $f$ is non-negative, since only its absolute value enters in the equation. Now, consider the real-valued function s on X given by

$$s(x) =
\begin{cases}
\varepsilon, & \text{if } f(x) \geq \varepsilon  \\
0, & \text{if } f(x) < \varepsilon
\end{cases}$$

Then $0\leq s(x)\leq f(x)$. By the definition of the Lebesgue integral

$$\int_X f(x) \, d\mu \geq \int_X s(x) \, d \mu = \varepsilon \mu( \{ x\in X : \, f(x) \geq \varepsilon \} )$$

and since $\varepsilon >0$, both sides can be divided by $\varepsilon$, obtaining

$$\mu(\{x\in X : \, f(x) \geq \varepsilon \}) \leq {1\over \varepsilon }\int_X f \,d\mu.$$

The extended version may be proved in the same fashion:

$$\varphi(\varepsilon) \cdot \mu(\{x \in X : |f(x)| \geq \varepsilon\}) = \int_{\{x \in X : |f(x)| \geq \varepsilon\}} \varphi(\varepsilon)\,d\mu \leq \int_{\{x \in X : |f(x)| \geq \varepsilon\}} \varphi(|f|)\,d\mu \leq \int_X \varphi(|f|)\,d\mu.$$

Diving through by $\varphi(\varepsilon)$ yields the result:

$$\mu(\{x\in X : \, |f(x)| \geq \varepsilon \}) \leq {1\over \varphi(\varepsilon) }\int_X \varphi(|f|) \,d\mu.$$

=== Chebyshev's inequality ===
Chebyshev's inequality uses the variance to bound the probability that a random variable deviates far from the mean. Specifically,

$$\operatorname{P}(|X-\operatorname{E}(X)| \geq a) \leq \frac{\operatorname{Var}(X)}{a^2},$$

for any a > 0. Here Var(X) is the variance of X, defined as:

$$\operatorname{Var}(X) = \operatorname{E}[(X - \operatorname{E}(X) )^2].$$

Chebyshev's inequality follows from Markov's inequality by considering the random variable

$$(X - \operatorname{E}(X))^2$$

and the constant $a^2,$ for which Markov's inequality reads

$$\operatorname{P}( (X - \operatorname{E}(X))^2 \ge a^2) \le \frac{\operatorname{Var}(X)}{a^2}.$$

This argument can be summarized (where "MI" indicates use of Markov's inequality):

$$\operatorname{P}(|X-\operatorname{E}(X)| \geq a) =
\operatorname{P}\left((X-\operatorname{E}(X))^2 \geq a^2\right) \,\overset{\underset{\mathrm{MI}}{}}{\leq}\,
\frac {\operatorname{E} \left( (X-\operatorname{E}(X))^2 \right)}{a^2} =
\frac{\operatorname{Var}(X)}{a^2}.$$

=== Other corollaries ===
1. The "monotonic" result can be demonstrated by:
  $$\operatorname P (|X| \ge a) = \operatorname P \big(\varphi(|X|) \ge \varphi(a)\big) \,\overset{\underset{\mathrm{MI}}{}}{\leq}\,
\frac{\operatorname E(\varphi(|X|))}{\varphi(a)}$$
2. The result that, for a nonnegative random variable X, the quantile function of X satisfies:
  $$Q_X(1-p) \leq \frac {\operatorname E(X)}{p},$$
  the proof using
  $$p \leq \operatorname P(X \geq Q_X(1-p)) \,\overset{\underset{\mathrm{MI}}{}}{\leq}\, \frac {\operatorname E(X)}{Q_X(1-p)}.$$
3. Let $M \succeq 0$ be a self-adjoint matrix-valued random variable and $A \succ 0$. Then
  $$\operatorname{P}(M \npreceq A) \leq \operatorname{Tr}(\operatorname E (M) A^{-1})$$
  which can be proved similarly.

== Examples ==
=== Example 1: Income distribution in populations ===
Assuming no income is negative, Markov's inequality shows that no more than 10% (1/10) of the population can have more than 10 times the average income.

=== Example 2: Distribution of test scores ===
Another simple example is as follows: Andrew makes 4 mistakes on average on his Statistics course tests. The best upper bound on the probability that Andrew will make at least 10 mistakes is 0.4 as $\operatorname{P}(X \geq 10) \leq \frac{\operatorname{E}(X)}{\alpha} = \frac{4}{10}.$ Note that Andrew might do exactly 10 mistakes with probability 0.4 and make no mistakes with probability 0.6; the expectation is exactly 4 mistakes.

=== Example 3: Heads in a sequence of coin flips ===
We want to find the probability of finding more than $3n/4$ heads in a sequence of $n$ coin flips. Since the coin flips form a binomial distribution, the expected number of heads is $np = \frac{n}{2}$, by Markov's inequality it follows that $\Pr(X \geq 3n/4) \leq \frac{n/2}{3n/4} = 2/3$.

== See also ==
- Paley–Zygmund inequality – a corresponding lower bound
- Concentration inequality – a summary of tail-bounds on random variables.
