= Irénée-Jules Bienaymé =

French mathematician

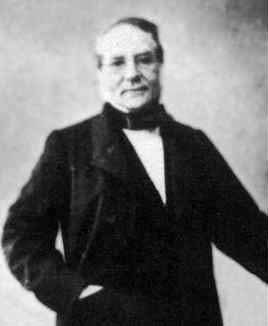
- Irénée-Jules Bienaymé
- Born: 28 August 1796; Paris, France
- Died: 19 October 1878 (aged 82); Paris, France
- Known for: Bienaymé–Chebyshev inequality Bienaymé formula
- Scientific career
- Fields: Statistics

Irénée-Jules Bienaymé (French: [iʁene ʒyl bjɛ̃nɛme]; 28 August 1796 – 19 October 1878) was a French statistician. He built on the legacy of Laplace generalizing his least squares method. He contributed to the fields of probability and statistics, and to their application to finance, demography and social sciences. In particular, he formulated the Bienaymé–Chebyshev inequality concerning the law of large numbers and the Bienaymé formula for the variance of a sum of uncorrelated random variables.

== Biography ==
Irénée-Jules Bienaymé continues the line of great French probability thinkers that began with Blaise Pascal and Pierre de Fermat, then carried on with Pierre-Simon Laplace and Siméon Denis Poisson.

His personal life was marked by bad fortune. He studied at the Lycée de Bruges and then at the Lycée Louis-le-Grand in Paris. After participating in the defense of Paris in 1814, he attended the École Polytechnique in 1815. Unfortunately that year's class was excluded in the following year by Louis XVIII because of their sympathy for Bonapartists.

In 1818, he lectured on mathematics at the Saint-Cyr Military Academy but, two years later, he entered the Finance Ministry. He was rapidly promoted, first to inspector, then to inspector general. But the new Republican administration removed him in 1848 for his lack of support for the Republican regime.

He became professor of probability at the Sorbonne, but he lost his position in 1851. He then became a consultant as an expert statistician for the government of Napoléon III.

In 1852 he was admitted to the French Academy of Sciences. After 23 years, Bienaymé became the examiner for the attribution of the academy's prize in statistics. He was also a founding member of the Société Mathématique de France, holding its presidency in 1875.

== Contributions to mathematics ==
Bienaymé published only 23 articles, half of which appeared in obscure conditions. His first works concerned demographics and actuarial tables. In particular he studied the extinction of closed families (aristocratic families for instance) which declined even as the general population was growing.

As a disciple of Laplace and under the influence of Laplace's Théorie analytique des probabilités (1812), he defended the latter's conceptions in a debate with Poisson on the size of juries and on the necessary majority for obtaining a conviction.

He translated into French the works of his friend the Russian mathematician Pafnuty Chebyshev, and published the Bienaymé–Chebyshev inequality which gives a simple demonstration of the law of large numbers. He corresponded with Adolphe Quetelet, and also had links with Gabriel Lamé.

Bienaymé criticized Poisson's "law of large numbers" and was involved in a controversy with Augustin Louis Cauchy. Both Bienaymé and Cauchy published regression methods at about the same time. Bienaymé had generalized the method of ordinary least squares. The dispute within the literature was over the superiority of one method over the other. It is now known that ordinary least squares is the best linear unbiased estimator, provided errors are uncorrelated and homoscedastic. At the time, this was not known. Cauchy developed the Cauchy distribution to show a case where the method of ordinary least squares resulted in a perfectly inefficient estimator. This is due to the fact that the Cauchy distribution has no defined variance to minimize. This is the first direct appearance of the Cauchy distribution in the academic literature. The curve had been previously studied by others, though in the English language as the Witch of Agnesi.
