= Unimodality =

Property of having a unique mode or maximum value

In mathematics, unimodality means possessing a unique mode. More generally, unimodality means there is only a single highest value, somehow defined, of some mathematical object.

== Unimodal probability distribution ==
Figure 1. Probability density function of normal distributions, an example of unimodal distribution.

Figure 2. A simple bimodal distribution.

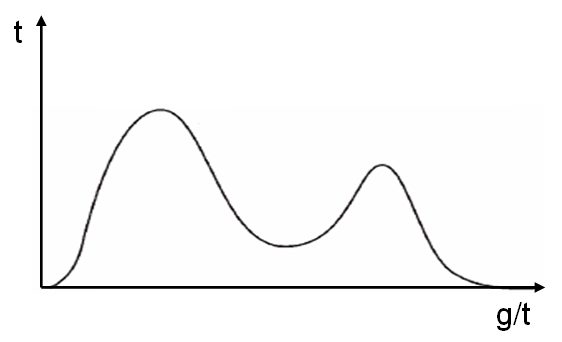
Figure 3. A bimodal distribution. Note that only the largest peak would correspond to a mode in the strict sense of the definition of mode

In statistics, a unimodal probability distribution or unimodal distribution is a probability distribution which has a single peak. The term "mode" in this context refers to any peak of the distribution, not just to the strict definition of mode which is usual in statistics.

If there is a single mode, the distribution function is called "unimodal". If it has more modes it is "bimodal" (2), "trimodal" (3), etc., or in general, "multimodal". Figure 1 illustrates normal distributions, which are unimodal. Other examples of unimodal distributions include Cauchy distribution, Student's t-distribution, chi-squared distribution and exponential distribution. Among discrete distributions, the binomial distribution and Poisson distribution can be seen as unimodal, though for some parameters they can have two adjacent values with the same probability.

Figure 2 and Figure 3 illustrate bimodal distributions.

=== Other definitions ===
Other definitions of unimodality in distribution functions also exist.

In continuous distributions, unimodality can be defined through the behavior of the cumulative distribution function (cdf). If the cdf is convex for x < m and concave for x > m, then the distribution is unimodal, m being the mode. Note that under this definition the uniform distribution is unimodal, as well as any other distribution in which the maximum distribution is achieved for a range of values, e.g. trapezoidal distribution. Usually this definition allows for a discontinuity at the mode; usually in a continuous distribution the probability of any single value is zero, while this definition allows for a non-zero probability, or an "atom of probability", at the mode.

Criteria for unimodality can also be defined through the characteristic function of the distribution or through its Laplace–Stieltjes transform.

Another way to define a unimodal discrete distribution is by the occurrence of sign changes in the sequence of differences of the probabilities. A discrete distribution with a probability mass function, $\{p_n : n = \dots, -1, 0, 1, \dots\}$, is called unimodal if the sequence $\dots, p_{-2} - p_{-1}, p_{-1} - p_0, p_0 - p_1, p_1 - p_2, \dots$ has exactly one sign change (when zeroes don't count).

=== Uses and results ===
One reason for the importance of distribution unimodality is that it allows for several important results. Several inequalities are given below which are only valid for unimodal distributions. Thus, it is important to assess whether or not a given data set comes from a unimodal distribution. Several tests for unimodality are given in the article on multimodal distribution.

=== Inequalities ===
==== Gauss's inequality ====
A first important result is Gauss's inequality. Gauss's inequality gives an upper bound on the probability that a value lies more than any given distance from its mode. This inequality depends on unimodality.

==== Vysochanskij–Petunin inequality ====
A second is the Vysochanskij–Petunin inequality, a refinement of the Chebyshev inequality. The Chebyshev inequality guarantees that in any probability distribution, "nearly all" the values are "close to" the mean value. The Vysochanskij–Petunin inequality refines this to even nearer values, provided that the distribution function is continuous and unimodal. Further results were shown by Sellke and Sellke.

==== Mode, median and mean ====
Gauss also showed in 1823 that for a unimodal distribution

$$\sigma \le \omega \le 2 \sigma$$

and

$$|\nu - \mu| \le \sqrt{\frac{3}{4}} \omega ,$$

where the median is ν, the mean is μ and ω is the root mean square deviation from the mode.

It can be shown for a unimodal distribution that the median ν and the mean μ lie within (3/5)^{1/2} ≈ 0.7746 standard deviations of each other. In symbols,

$$\frac{|\nu - \mu|}{\sigma} \le \sqrt{\frac{3}{5}}$$

where | . | is the absolute value.

In 2020, Bernard, Kazzi, and Vanduffel generalized the previous inequality by deriving the maximum distance between the symmetric quantile average $\frac{ q_\alpha + q_{(1-\alpha)} }{ 2 }$ and the mean,

$$\frac{ \left| \frac{ q_\alpha  + q_{(1-\alpha)} }{2}  - \mu \right| }{ \sigma } \le \left\{
\begin{array}{cl}
\frac{\sqrt[]{\frac{4}{9(1-\alpha)}-1} \text{ } + \text{ } \sqrt[]{\frac{1-\alpha}{1/3+\alpha}}}{2}
& \text{for }\alpha \in  \left[\frac{5}{6},1\right)\!, \\
\frac{\sqrt[]{\frac{3 \alpha}{4-3\alpha}} \text{ } + \text{ } \sqrt[]{\frac{1-\alpha}{1/3+\alpha}}}{2}
& \text{for }\alpha \in \left(\frac{1}{6},\frac{5}{6}\right)\!,\\
\frac{\sqrt[]{\frac{3 \alpha}{4-3\alpha}} \text{ } + \text{ } \sqrt[]{\frac{4}{9 \alpha} -1}}{2}
& \text{for }\alpha \in  \left(0,\frac{1}{6}\right]\!.
\end{array}
\right.$$

The maximum distance is minimized at $\alpha=0.5$ (i.e., when the symmetric quantile average is equal to $q_{0.5} = \nu$), which indeed motivates the common choice of the median as a robust estimator for the mean. Moreover, when $\alpha = 0.5$, the bound is equal to $\sqrt{3/5}$, which is the maximum distance between the median and the mean of a unimodal distribution.

A similar relation holds between the median and the mode θ: they lie within 3^{1/2} ≈ 1.732 standard deviations of each other:

$$\frac{|\nu - \theta|}{\sigma} \le \sqrt{3}.$$

It can also be shown that the mean and the mode lie within 3^{1/2} of each other:

$$\frac{|\mu - \theta|}{\sigma} \le \sqrt{3}.$$

==== Skewness and kurtosis ====
Rohatgi and Szekely claimed that the skewness and kurtosis of a unimodal distribution are related by the inequality:

$$\gamma^2 - \kappa \le \frac{ 6 }{ 5 } = 1.2$$

where κ is the kurtosis and γ is the skewness. Klaassen, Mokveld, and van Es showed that this only applies in certain settings, such as the set of unimodal distributions where the mode and mean coincide.

They derived a weaker inequality which applies to all unimodal distributions:

$$\gamma^2 - \kappa \le \frac{ 186 }{ 125 } = 1.488$$

This bound is sharp, as it is reached by the equal-weights mixture of the uniform distribution on [0,1] and the discrete distribution at {0}.

== Unimodal function ==
As the term "modal" applies to data sets and probability distribution, and not in general to functions, the definitions above do not apply. The definition of "unimodal" was extended to functions of real numbers as well.

A common definition is as follows: a function f(x) is a unimodal function if for some value m, it is monotonically increasing for x ≤ m and monotonically decreasing for x ≥ m. In that case, the maximum value of f(x) is f(m) and there are no other local maxima.

Proving unimodality is often hard. One way consists in using the definition of that property, but it turns out to be suitable for simple functions only. A general method based on derivatives exists, but it does not succeed for every function despite its simplicity.

Examples of unimodal functions include quadratic polynomial functions with a negative quadratic coefficient, tent map functions, and more.

The above is sometimes related to as strong unimodality, from the fact that the monotonicity implied is strong monotonicity. A function f(x) is a weakly unimodal function if there exists a value m for which it is weakly monotonically increasing for x ≤ m and weakly monotonically decreasing for x ≥ m. In that case, the maximum value f(m) can be reached for a continuous range of values of x. An example of a weakly unimodal function which is not strongly unimodal is every other row in Pascal's triangle.

Depending on context, unimodal function may also refer to a function that has only one local minimum, rather than maximum. For example, local unimodal sampling, a method for doing numerical optimization, is often demonstrated with such a function. It can be said that a unimodal function under this extension is a function with a single local extremum.

One important property of unimodal functions is that the extremum can be found using search algorithms such as golden section search, ternary search or successive parabolic interpolation.

== Other extensions ==
A function f(x) is "S-unimodal" (often referred to as "S-unimodal map") if its Schwarzian derivative is negative for all $x \ne c$, where $c$ is the critical point.

In computational geometry if a function is unimodal it permits the design of efficient algorithms for finding the extrema of the function.

A more general definition, applicable to a function f(X) of a vector variable X is that f is unimodal if there is a one-to-one differentiable mapping X = G(Z) such that f(G(Z)) is convex. Usually one would want G(Z) to be continuously differentiable with nonsingular Jacobian matrix.

Quasiconvex functions and quasiconcave functions extend the concept of unimodality to functions whose arguments belong to higher-dimensional Euclidean spaces.

A unimodal function mapping $\{0,1,\dots,n\}$ to the reals is also called unimodal sequence. A unimodal polynomial is a polynomial whose coefficients are a unimodal sequence.

== See also ==
- Bimodal distribution
- Read's conjecture
