= Analytic and enumerative statistical studies =

Analytic and enumerative statistical studies are two types of scientific studies:

In any statistical study the ultimate aim is to provide a rational basis for action. Enumerative and analytic studies differ by where the action is taken. Deming first published on this topic in 1942. Deming summarized the distinction between enumerative and analytic studies as follows:

Enumerative study: A statistical study in which action will be taken on the material in the frame being studied.

Analytic study: A statistical study in which action will be taken on the process or cause-system that produced the frame being studied. The aim being to improve practice in the future.

(In a statistical study, the frame is the set from which the sample is taken.)

These terms were introduced in Some Theory of Sampling (1950, Chapter 7) by W. Edwards Deming.

In other words, an enumerative study is a statistical study in which the focus is on judgment of results, and an analytic study is one in which the focus is on improvement of the process or system which created the results being evaluated and which will continue creating results in the future. A statistical study can be enumerative or analytic, but it cannot be both.

Statistical theory in enumerative studies is used to describe the precision of estimates and the validity of hypotheses for the population studied. In analytical studies, the standard error of a statistic does not address the most important source of uncertainty, namely, the change in study conditions in the future. Although analytical studies need to take into account the uncertainty due to sampling, as in enumerative studies, the attributes of the study design and analysis of the data primarily deal with the uncertainty resulting from extrapolation to the future (generalisation to the conditions in future time periods). The methods used in analytical studies encourage the exploration of mechanisms through multifactor designs, contextual variables introduced through blocking and replication over time.

This distinction between enumerative and analytic studies is the theory behind the Fourteen Points for Management. Dr. Deming's philosophy is that management should be analytic instead of enumerative. In other words, management should focus on improvement of processes for the future instead of on judgment of current results.

"Use of data requires knowledge about the different sources of uncertainty.

Measurement is a process. Is the system of measurement stable or unstable? Use

of data requires also understanding of the distinction between enumerative studies and analytic problems."

"The interpretation of results of a test or experiment is something else. It is prediction that a specific change in a process or procedure will be a wise choice, or that no change would be better. Either way the choice is prediction. This is known as an analytic problem, or a problem of inference, prediction."

== Notes ==
Neave HR. The deming dimension. Knoxville, Tenn: SPC Press; 1990:440.
