= Cochran's theorem =

Statistical theorem in the analysis of variance

In statistics, Cochran's theorem, devised by William G. Cochran, is a theorem used to justify results relating to the probability distributions of statistics that are used in the analysis of variance.

== Statement ==
Let $U_1, \cdots, U_N$ be i.i.d. standard normally distributed random variables, and $U = [U_1, ..., U_N]^T$. Let $B^{(1)},B^{(2)},\ldots, B^{(k)}$ be symmetric matrices. Define r_{i} to be the rank of $B^{(i)}$. Define $Q_i=U^T B^{(i)}U$, so that the Q_{i} are quadratic forms. Further assume $\sum_i Q_i = U^T U$.

Cochran's theorem states that the following are equivalent:

- $r_1+\cdots +r_k=N$,
- the Q_{i} are independent
- each Q_{i} has a chi-squared distribution with r_{i} degrees of freedom.

Often it's stated as $\sum_i A_i = A$, where $A$ is idempotent, and $\sum_i r_i = N$ is replaced by $\sum_i r_i = \operatorname{rank}(A)$. But after an orthogonal transform, $A = \operatorname{diag}(I_M, 0)$, and so we reduce to the above theorem. Here, $\operatorname{diag}$ denotes the diagonal transform.

== Alternative formulation ==
The following version is often seen when considering linear regression. Suppose that $Y\sim N_n(0,\sigma^2I_n)$ is a standard multivariate normal random vector (here $I_n$ denotes the n-by-n identity matrix), and if $A_1,\ldots,A_k$ are all n-by-n symmetric matrices with $\sum_{i=1}^kA_i=I_n$. Then, on defining $r_i= \operatorname{rank}(A_i)$, any one of the following conditions implies the other two:

- $\sum_{i=1}^kr_i=n ,$
- $Y^TA_iY\sim\sigma^2\chi^2_{r_i}$ (thus the $A_i$ are positive semidefinite)
- $Y^TA_iY$ is independent of $Y^TA_jY$ for $i\neq j .$

== Examples ==
=== Sample mean and sample variance ===
If X_{1}, ..., X_{n} are independent normally distributed random variables with mean μ and standard deviation σ then

$$U_i = \frac{X_i-\mu}{\sigma}$$

is standard normal for each i. Note that the total Q is equal to sum of squared Us as shown here:

$$\sum_iQ_i=\sum_{jik} U_j B_{jk}^{(i)} U_k = \sum_{jk} U_j U_k \sum_i B_{jk}^{(i)} =
\sum_{jk} U_j U_k\delta_{jk} = \sum_{j} U_j^2$$

which stems from the original assumption that $B_{1} + B_{2} \ldots = I$. So instead we will calculate this quantity and later separate it into Q_{i}'s. It is possible to write

$$\sum_{i=1}^n U_i^2=\sum_{i=1}^n\left(\frac{X_i-\overline{X}}{\sigma}\right)^2
+ n\left(\frac{\overline{X}-\mu}{\sigma}\right)^2$$

(here $\overline{X}$ is the sample mean). To see this identity, multiply throughout by $\sigma^2$ and note that

$$\sum(X_i-\mu)^2=
\sum(X_i-\overline{X}+\overline{X}-\mu)^2$$

and expand to give

$$\sum(X_i-\mu)^2=
\sum(X_i-\overline{X})^2+\sum(\overline{X}-\mu)^2+
2\sum(X_i-\overline{X})(\overline{X}-\mu).$$

The third term is zero because it is equal to a constant times

$$\sum(\overline{X}-X_i)=0,$$

and the second term has just n identical terms added together. Thus

$$\sum(X_i-\mu)^2 = \sum(X_i-\overline{X})^2+n(\overline{X}-\mu)^2 ,$$

and hence

$$\sum\left(\tfrac{X_i-\mu}{\sigma}\right)^2=
\sum\left(\tfrac{X_i-\overline{X}}{\sigma}\right)^2
+n\left(\tfrac{\overline{X}-\mu}{\sigma}\right)^2=
\overbrace{\sum_i\left(U_i-\tfrac{1}{n}\sum_j{U_j}\right)^2}^{Q_1}
+\overbrace{\tfrac{1}{n}\left(\sum_j{U_j}\right)^2}^{Q_2}=
Q_1+Q_2.$$

Now $B^{(2)}=\frac{J_n}{n}$ with $J_n$ the matrix of ones which has rank 1. In turn $B^{(1)}= I_n-\frac{J_n}{n}$ given that $I_n=B^{(1)}+B^{(2)}$. This expression can be also obtained by expanding $Q_1$ in matrix notation. It can be shown that the rank of $B^{(1)}$ is $n-1$ as the addition of all its rows is equal to zero. Thus the conditions for Cochran's theorem are met.

Cochran's theorem then states that Q_{1} and Q_{2} are independent, with chi-squared distributions with n − 1 and 1 degree of freedom respectively. This shows that the sample mean and sample variance are independent. This can also be shown by Basu's theorem, and in fact this property characterizes the normal distribution – for no other distribution are the sample mean and sample variance independent.

=== Distributions ===
The result for the distributions is written symbolically as

$$\sum\left(X_i-\overline{X}\right)^2  \sim \sigma^2 \chi^2_{n-1}.$$
$$n(\overline{X}-\mu)^2\sim \sigma^2 \chi^2_1,$$

Both these random variables are proportional to the true but unknown variance σ^{2}. Thus their ratio does not depend on σ^{2} and, because they are statistically independent. The distribution of their ratio is given by

$$\frac{n\left(\overline{X}-\mu\right)^2}
{\frac{1}{n-1}\sum\left(X_i-\overline{X}\right)^2}\sim \frac{\chi^2_1}{\frac{1}{n-1}\chi^2_{n-1}}
\sim F_{1,n-1}$$

where F_{1,n − 1} is the F-distribution with 1 and n − 1 degrees of freedom (see also Student's t-distribution). The final step here is effectively the definition of a random variable having the F-distribution.

=== Estimation of variance ===
To estimate the variance σ^{2}, one estimator that is sometimes used is the maximum likelihood estimator of the variance of a normal distribution

$$\widehat{\sigma}^2=
\frac{1}{n}\sum\left(
X_i-\overline{X}\right)^2.$$

Cochran's theorem shows that

$$\frac{n\widehat{\sigma}^2}{\sigma^2}\sim\chi^2_{n-1}$$

and the properties of the chi-squared distribution show that

$$\begin{align}
E \left(\frac{n \widehat{\sigma}^2}{\sigma^2}\right) &= E \left(\chi^2_{n-1}\right) \\
\frac{n}{\sigma^2}E \left(\widehat{\sigma}^2\right) &= (n-1) \\
E \left(\widehat{\sigma}^2\right) &= \frac{\sigma^2 (n-1)}{n}
\end{align}$$

== Proof ==
Claim: Let $X$ be a standard Gaussian in $\R^n$, then for any symmetric matrices $Q, Q'$, if $X^T Q X$ and $X^T Q' X$ have the same distribution, then $Q, Q'$ have the same eigenvalues (up to multiplicity).

Proof

Let the eigenvalues of $Q$ be $\lambda_1, ..., \lambda_n$, then calculate the characteristic function of $X^T Q X$. It comes out to be

$\phi(t) =\left(\prod_j (1-2i \lambda_j t)\right)^{-1/2}$

(To calculate it, first diagonalize $Q$, change into that frame, then use the fact that the characteristic function of the sum of independent variables is the product of their characteristic functions.)

For $X^T Q X$ and $X^T Q' X$ to be equal, their characteristic functions must be equal, so $Q, Q'$ have the same eigenvalues (up to multiplicity).

Claim: $I = \sum_i B_i$.

Proof

$U^T (I - \sum_i B_i) U = 0$. Since $(I - \sum_i B_i)$ is symmetric, and $U^T (I - \sum_i B_i) U =^d U^T 0 U$, by the previous claim, $(I - \sum_i B_i)$ has the same eigenvalues as 0.

Lemma: If $\sum_i M_i = I$, all $M_i$ symmetric, and have eigenvalues 0, 1, then they are simultaneously diagonalizable.

Proof

Fix i, and consider the eigenvectors v of $M_i$ such that $M_i v = v$. Then we have $v^T v = v^T I v = v^T v + \sum_{j\neq i} v^T M_j v$. We note that the $M_j$s are positive semi-definite, since their eigenvectors are all non-negative; so, for all $j$s we must have $v^T M_j v = 0$. Thus we obtain a split of $\R^N$ into $V\oplus V^\perp$, such that the 1-eigenspace $V$ of $M_i$ is contained in the 0-eigenspaces of $M_j$ for $j\neq i$. Now induct by moving into $V^\perp$. If $M_i\neq0$ for all $i$s, then a basis diagonalizing simultaneously each $M_i$ is given by $(v_{1,1},\dots,v_{r_1,1},\dots,v_{1,k},\dots,v_{r_k,k})$, where $(v_{1,i},\dots,v_{r_i,i})$ is a basis of the 1-eigenspace of $M_i$.

Now we prove the original theorem. We prove that the three cases are equivalent by proving that each case implies the next one in a cycle ($1 \to 2 \to 3 \to 1$).

Proof

Case: All $Q_i$ are independent

Fix some $i$, define $C_i = I - B_i = \sum_{j\neq i} B_j$, and diagonalize $B_i$ by an orthogonal transform $O$. Then consider $O C_i O^T = I - O B_i O^T$. It is diagonalized as well.

Let $W = OU$, then it is also standard Gaussian. Then we have

$Q_i = W^T (OB_i O^T) W; \quad \sum_{j\neq i} Q_j = W^T (I - OB_i O^T) W$

Inspect their diagonal entries, to see that $Q_i \perp \sum_{j\neq i} Q_j$ implies that their nonzero diagonal entries are disjoint.

Thus all eigenvalues of $B_i$ are 0, 1, so $Q_i$ is a $\chi^2$ dist with $r_i$ degrees of freedom.

Case: Each $Q_i$ is a $\chi^2(r_i)$ distribution.

Fix any $i$, diagonalize it by orthogonal transform $O$, and reindex, so that $O B_i O^T = diag(\lambda_1, ..., \lambda_{r_i}, 0, ..., 0)$. Then $Q_i = \sum_j \lambda_j {U'}_j^2$ for some $U'_j$, a spherical rotation of $U_i$.

Since $Q_i\sim \chi^2(r_i)$, we get all $\lambda_j = 1$. So all $B_i\succeq 0$, and have eigenvalues $0, 1$.

So diagonalize them simultaneously, add them up, to find $\sum_i r_i = N$.

Case: $r_1+\cdots +r_k=N$.

We first show that the matrices B^{(i)} can be simultaneously diagonalized by an orthogonal matrix and that their non-zero eigenvalues are all equal to +1. Once that's shown, take this orthogonal transform to this simultaneous eigenbasis, in which the random vector $[U_1, ..., U_N]^T$ becomes $[U'_1, ..., U'_N]^T$, but all $U_i'$ are still independent and standard Gaussian. Then the result follows.

Each of the matrices B^{(i)} has rank r_{i} and thus r_{i} non-zero eigenvalues. For each i, the sum $C^{(i)} \equiv \sum_{j\ne i}B^{(j)}$ has at most rank $\sum_{j\ne i}r_j = N-r_i$. Since $B^{(i)}+C^{(i)} = I_{N \times N}$, it follows that C^{(i)} has exactly rank N − r_{i}.

Therefore B^{(i)} and C^{(i)} can be simultaneously diagonalized. This can be shown by first diagonalizing B^{(i)}, by the spectral theorem. In this basis, it is of the form:

$$\begin{bmatrix}
\lambda_1  & 0          & 0      & \cdots        & \cdots &        & 0 \\
0          & \lambda_2  & 0      & \cdots        & \cdots &        & 0 \\
0          &  0         & \ddots &               &        &        & \vdots \\
\vdots     &  \vdots    &        & \lambda_{r_i} &        & \\
\vdots     & \vdots     &        &               &  0     & \\
0          & \vdots     &        &               &        & \ddots \\
0          & 0          & \ldots &               &        &        & 0
\end{bmatrix}.$$

Thus the lower $(N-r_i)$ rows are zero. Since $C^{(i)} = I - B^{(i)}$, it follows that these rows in C^{(i)} in this basis contain a right block which is a $(N-r_i)\times(N-r_i)$ unit matrix, with zeros in the rest of these rows. But since C^{(i)} has rank N − r_{i}, it must be zero elsewhere. Thus it is diagonal in this basis as well. It follows that all the non-zero eigenvalues of both B^{(i)} and C^{(i)} are +1. This argument applies for all i, thus all B^{(i)} are positive semidefinite.

Moreover, the above analysis can be repeated in the diagonal basis for $C^{(1)} = B^{(2)} + \sum_{j>2}B^{(j)}$. In this basis $C^{(1)}$ is the identity of an $(N-r_1)\times(N-r_1)$ vector space, so it follows that both B^{(2)} and $\sum_{j>2}B^{(j)}$ are simultaneously diagonalizable in this vector space (and hence also together with B^{(1)}). By iteration it follows that all B-s are simultaneously diagonalizable.

Thus there exists an orthogonal matrix $S$ such that for all $i$, $S^\mathrm{T}B^{(i)} S \equiv B^{(i)\prime}$ is diagonal, where any entry $B^{(i)\prime}_{x,y}$ with indices $x = y$, $\sum_{j=1}^{i-1} r_j < x = y \le \sum_{j=1}^i r_j$, is equal to 1, while any entry with other indices is equal to 0.

== See also ==
- Cramér's theorem, on decomposing normal distribution
- Infinite divisibility (probability)
