= Bienaymé's identity =

Formula on random variables

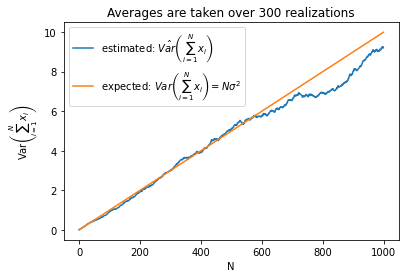
Estimated variance of the cumulative sum of iid normally distributed random variables (which could represent a gaussian random walk approximating a Wiener process). The sample variance is computed over 300 realizations of the corresponding random process.

In probability theory, the general form of Bienaymé's identity, named for Irénée-Jules Bienaymé, states that

$$\begin{align}
\operatorname{Var}\left( \sum_{i=1}^n X_i \right)
&= \sum_{i=1}^n \operatorname{Var}(X_i)+2\sum_{i,j=1 \atop i < j}^n \operatorname{Cov}(X_i,X_j) \\
&= \sum_{i,j=1}^n\operatorname{Cov}(X_i,X_j).
\end{align}$$

This can be simplified if $X_1, \ldots, X_n$ are pairwise independent or just uncorrelated, integrable random variables, each with finite second moment. This simplification gives:

$$\operatorname{Var}\left(\sum_{i=1}^n X_i\right) = \sum_{k=1}^n \operatorname{Var}(X_k).$$

The above expression is sometimes referred to as Bienaymé's formula. Bienaymé's identity may be used in proving certain variants of the law of large numbers.

== See also ==
- Variance
- Propagation of error
- Markov chain central limit theorem
- Panjer recursion
- Inverse-variance weighting
- Donsker's theorem
- Paired difference test
