= Lehmann–Scheffé theorem =

Theorem in statistics

In statistics, the Lehmann–Scheffé theorem provides sufficient conditions for the existence of a best unbiased estimator in a statistical model. The theorem states that any unbiased estimator for a quantity that depends on the data only through a complete, sufficient statistic is the unique uniformly minimum-variance unbiased estimator (UMVUE) of that quantity. The Lehmann–Scheffé theorem is named after Erich Leo Lehmann and Henry Scheffé, given their two early papers.

== Introduction ==
Given a vector $X= (X_1, X_2, \dots, X_n)$ of random samples from a distribution $\mathbb{P}_\theta$ for some parameter $\theta\in\Theta$, the goal is to establish sufficient conditions for the existence of an UMVU estimator $T^\ast(X)$ for some quantity $g(\theta)$, that is, $\mathbb{E}_\theta[T^\ast(X)]=g(\theta)$ and for any unbiased estimator $S(X)$ it holds

$$\mathrm{Var}_\theta(T^\ast(X))\leq\mathrm{Var}_\theta(S(X)),\quad \forall\theta\in\Theta.$$

The Rao–Blackwell theorem already shows that, given a sufficient statistic $T$, the estimator $T^\ast(X)=\mathbb E[S(X)\mid T(X)]$ has a uniformly smaller variance than $S(X)$, but it does not guarantee that $T^\ast$ is already UMVU. This is where the Lehmann–Scheffé theorem comes in, if $T$ is also complete, that is, for any real-valued measurable function $\varphi$ it holds

$$\mathbb E_\theta[\varphi(T(X))]=0\implies \varphi(T(X))=0 \quad\mathbb P_\theta\text{-a.s.}$$

== Statement ==
As above, let $X= (X_1, X_2, \dots, X_n)$ be a vector of random samples from a distribution $\mathbb{P}_\theta$ for some parameter $\theta\in\Theta$ and $\Theta$ an arbitrary set.

Assume that there exists a complete, sufficient statistic $T$ for the family of distributions $(\mathbb{P}_\theta)_{\theta\in\Theta}$. Then, the following two equivalent statements hold:

- There exists at most one measurable function $h$ such that $T^\ast=h(T(X))$ is unbiased for $g(\theta)$ and $\mathbb{E}_\theta[T^\ast(X)^2]<\infty$ for all $\theta\in\Theta$, in which case $T^\ast(X)$ is the unique UMVUE for $g(\theta)$.
- For any unbiased estimator $S(X)$, if it exists, with $\mathbb{E}_\theta[S(X)^2]<\infty$ for all $\theta\in\Theta$, the estimator $T^\ast(X)=\mathbb{E}_\theta[S(X)\mid T(X)]$ is the unique UMVUE for $g(\theta)$.

In fact, the theorem does not state that unbiased estimators exist in the first place. However, if they do, then there exists a unique square-integrable UMVUE. Moreover, the estimator $T^\ast(X)=\mathbb{E}_\theta[S(X)\mid T(X)]$ does neither depend on $\theta$, since $T$ is sufficient, nor on $S$, since $T$ is also complete.

=== Proof ===
In the following, the dependence of an estimator on the data $X$ will not be written out explicitly, i.e., we write $S$ instead of $S(X)$.

First of all, if there is no unbiased estimator for $g(\theta)$, then there is obviously no UMVUE, and if all unbiased estimator are not square-integrable, then their variances are infinity and the statement is trivial. Thus, we focus on the case where a square-integrable unbiased estimator exists.

Uniqueness of $h$: Let $S=h_1(T)$ and $R=h_2(T)$ be unbiased estimators of $g(\theta)$ for some measurable functions $h_1$ and $h_2$. For the expectation of the difference it holds
$$\mathbb{E}_\theta[h_1(T)-h_2(T)]=g(\theta)-g(\theta)=0.$$
Since $T$ is complete, this implies $h_1-h_2=0$. Thus, $T^\ast=h_1(T)=:h(T)$ is the unique unbiased estimator that is a function of $T$.

$h(T)$ is the UMVUE: Let $S$ be any square-integrable unbiased estimator and $S^\ast=\mathbb{E}_\theta[S\mid T]$. By the factorization lemma there exists measurable function $\tilde h$ such that $S^\ast=\tilde h(T)$ and since $S^\ast$ is unbiased as well, by the above, it must hold $S^\ast=\tilde h(T)=h(T)=T^\ast$. Thus, by the Rao–Blackwell theorem, it follows
$$\mathrm{Var}_\theta(T^\ast)=\mathrm{Var}_\theta(S^\ast)=\mathrm{Var}_\theta(\mathbb{E}_\theta[S\mid T])\leq \mathrm{Var}_\theta(S), \quad \forall \theta\in\Theta.$$
In other words, $T^\ast=h(T)$ is an UMVUE and according to the first part it is unique.

== Application ==
The Lehmann–Scheffé theorem motivates two general methods to construct UMVU estimators for $g(\theta)$ in models which allow for a complete sufficient statistic $T$.

Method 1: Determining the function $h$

The UMVUE, if it exists, is the (unique) solution of the equation
$$\mathbb{E}_\theta[h(T)]=g(\theta)$$
for all $\theta\in\Theta$. If $h$ is, for example, a linear function, then solving this equation is fairly easy.

Method 2: Conditioning on an unbiased estimator

First, it suffices to find any unbiased estimator $S$ of $g(\theta)$, which is often easily feasible. The UMVUE can then be determined by evaluating the condition expectation $\mathbb{E}_\theta[S\mid T]$. Since the choice of $S$ is arbitrary, it is preferable to choose it such that the conditional expectation is as simple as possible.

== Examples ==
=== Bernoulli distribution ===
Let $X_1,\dots,X_n$ be Bernoulli-distributed with probability $p\in(0,1)$. The joint probability mass function $f_p$ is of the form
$$f_p(x_1,\dots,x_n)=\prod_{i=1}^n p^{x_i}(1-p)^{1-x_i} = \left(\frac{p}{1-p}\right)^{\sum_{i=1}^n x_i} (1-p)^n, \quad x_i\in\{0,1\},$$
thus, by the Fisher–Neyman factorization theorem, $T(x)=\sum_{i=1}^n x_i$ is a sufficient statistic. It is also complete: Let $\varphi$ be any measurable function such that $\mathbb{E}_\theta[\varphi(T(X))]=0$. Since $T$ is $\mathrm{Ber}(n,p)$-distributed, this means
$$0=\mathbb{E}_\theta[\varphi(T(X))]=\sum_{k=0}^n \varphi(k)\binom{n}{k}p^k(1-p)^{n-k}=(1-p)^n\sum_{k=0}^n \varphi(k)\binom{n}{k} r^k,$$
with $r=p/(1-p)$. Since the right hand side is a polynomial in $r>0$ that is equal to zero, each coefficient must be zero as well, implying $\varphi(k)=0$ for all $k$.

For the estimation of the parameter $p$, it is now easy to see that the UMVUE is the sample mean
$$\overline{X}=\frac{1}{n}\sum_{i=1}^n X_i = \frac{1}{n}T(X),$$
since it is unbiased and a function of $T(X)$.

Finding the UMVUE for the parameter $p(1-p)$ (that is, the variance of the distribution) is less obvious. According to method 1, we seek a function $h$ such that
$$p(1-p)=\mathbb{E}_p[h(T(X))]=\sum_{k=0}^n h(k)\binom{n}{k}p^k(1-p)^{n-k}.$$
By defining $\rho=p/(1-p)$, the above rewrites as
$$\sum_{k=0}^n h(k)\binom{n}{k}\rho^k = \rho(1+\rho)^{n-2} = \sum_{k=1}^{n-1}\binom{n-1}{k-1}\rho^k.$$
Comparing the coefficients shows that $h(k)=k(n-k)/(n(n-1))$, thus, the UMVUE is given by
$$h(T(X))=\frac{n}{n-1}\overline{X}(1-\overline{X}).$$
Noting that in the Bernoulli model $X_i=X_i^2$ and that $\sum_{i=1}^n(X_i-\overline{X})^2 = \sum_{i=1}^nX_i^2 - n\overline{X}^2$, the UMVUE is, in fact, the unbiased sample variance $S_n^2$.

=== Uniform distribution ===
Let $X_1,\dots,X_n$ be uniformly distributed on the interval $(0,\theta)$ for some $\theta$ to be determined. The joint probability mass function $f_p$ is of the form
$$f_p(x_1,\dots,x_n)=\prod_{i=1}^n \frac{1}{\theta}1_{(0,\theta)}(x_i) = \frac{1}{\theta^n} 1_{[0,\infty)}\left(\min_{i=1,\dots,n}x_i\right)1_{(-\infty,\theta]}\left(\max_{i=1,\dots,n}x_i\right), \quad x\in\R^n,$$
thus, by the Fisher–Neyman factorization theorem, $T(x)=\max_{i=1,\dots,n} x_i$ is a sufficient statistic.

To see the completeness of $T$, the distribution of $T(X)$ is

$$\mathbb P_\theta(T(X)\leq t)=\mathbb P_\theta(X_i\leq t, \forall i=1,\dots,n)=\prod_{i=1}^n\mathbb P_\theta(X_i\leq t) = \prod_{i=1}^n\frac{t}{\theta}=\frac{t^n}{\theta^n}.$$

Thus, for any measurable function $\varphi$ such that $\mathbb{E}_\theta[\varphi(T(X))]=0$ it holds for any $\theta>0$

$$0=\mathbb{E}_\theta[\varphi(T(X))]=\int_0^\theta \varphi(x)\frac{n}{\theta^n}x^{n-1}\mathrm{d}x \implies \int_0^\theta \varphi(x)x^{n-1}\mathrm{d}x=0,$$

and consequently for any $b>a>0$

$$\int_a^b\varphi(x)x^{n-1}\mathrm{d}x = \int_0^b\varphi(x)x^{n-1}\mathrm{d}x - \int_0^a\varphi(x)x^{n-1}\mathrm{d}x=0.$$

This implies that $\varphi=0$ (almost everywhere) on $[0,\infty)$. So $T$ is also complete. Its expectation is

$$\mathbb E_\theta[T(X)]=\int_0^\theta x\frac{n}{\theta^n}x^{n-1}\mathrm{d}x = \frac{n}{\theta^n}\frac{\theta^{n+1}}{n+1}=\frac{n}{n+1}\theta.$$

Thus, the rescaled estimator

$$T^\ast(X)=\frac{n+1}{n}T(X)=\frac{n+1}{n}\max_{i=1,\dots,n}X_i$$

is unbiased and since it is a function of $T$, it is the UMVUE for $\theta$.

=== Exponential distribution ===
Let $X_1,\dots,X_n$ be exponentially distributed with parameter $\lambda$ and suppose the parameter $g(\lambda)=\mathbb P_\lambda(X_1>t)$ should be estimated for some fixed $t>0$. A straightforward unbiased estimator for $g(\lambda)$ would be $\widehat{g(\lambda)}=\frac{1}{n}\sum_{i=1}^n 1_{\{X_i>t\}}$, however, it turns out to be sub-optimal.

Since the exponential distribution is an exponential family, it is known that its sufficient statistic $\overline X=\frac{1}{n}\sum_{i=1}^nX_i$ is also complete. Moreover, the estimator $T=1_{\{X_1>t \}}$ is unbiased. Thus, according to method 2, the estimator $T^\ast = \mathbb E[T\mid \overline X]=\mathbb P(X_1>t\mid\overline X)$ is the UMVUE. It remains to evaluate the conditional expectation.

First of all, $X_1/(n\overline X)\sim\mathrm{Beta}(1,n-1)$, which is independent of $\lambda$ (also called ancillary). In fact, since $X_1$ and $S=\sum_{i=2}^n X_i$ are independent and $S\sim \Gamma(n-1,\lambda)$, the cumulative distribution function at $y\in(0,1)$ reads as

$$\begin{align}
\mathbb P\left(\frac{X_1}{n\overline X}\leq y\right) &= \mathbb P\left(\frac{X_1}{X_1+S}\leq y\right)\\
&= \int_0^\infty\int_0^\infty 1_{\{x/(x+s)\leq y\}}\lambda e^{-\lambda x} \frac{\lambda^{n-1}}{(n-2)!}s^{n-2}e^{-\lambda s}\mathrm{d}x\mathrm{d}s \\
&= \int_0^1\int_0^\infty 1_{\{u\leq y\}} \frac{\lambda^n}{(n-2)!}r^{n-2}(1-u)^{n-2}e^{-\lambda r}r\mathrm{d}r\mathrm{d}u \\
&= \int_0^1 1_{\{u\leq y\}}(1-u)^{n-2}\frac{1}{(n-2)!}\underbrace{\int_0^\infty \lambda^n r^{n-1}e^{-\lambda r}\mathrm{d}r}_{=(n-1)!}\mathrm{d}u \\
&= \int_0^y (n-1)(1-u)^{n-2}\mathrm{d}u,
\end{align}$$

with the substitution $x=ru$ and $s=r(1-u)$. Thus, by Basu's theorem, $X_1/(n\overline X)$ and $\overline X$ are independent and the conditional expectation simplifies to

$$\mathbb P(X_1>t\mid \overline X=x) = \mathbb P\left(\frac{X_1}{n\overline X}>\frac{t}{n\overline X}\mid \overline X=x\right) = \mathbb P\left(\frac{X_1}{n\overline X}>\frac{t}{nx}\right) = \left(1-\frac{t}{nx}\right)^{n-1}.$$

due to the above derivation. The constructed estimator

$$T^\ast=\left(1-\frac{t}{n\overline{X}} \right)^{n-1}$$

is unbiased and has a smaller variance than the naive estimator $\widehat{g(\lambda)}$ for all possible $\lambda>0$.

=== Counterexample with incomplete statistics ===
An example of an improvable Rao–Blackwell improvement, when using a minimal sufficient statistic that is not complete, was provided by Galili and Meilijson in 2016. Let $X_1, \ldots, X_n$ be a random sample from a scale-uniform distribution $X \sim U ( (1-k) \theta, (1+k) \theta),$ with unknown mean $\operatorname{E}[X]=\theta$ and known design parameter $k \in (0,1)$. In the search for "best" possible unbiased estimators for $\theta$, it is natural to consider $X_1$ as an initial (crude) unbiased estimator for $\theta$ and then try to improve it. Since $X_1$ is not a function of $T = \left( X_{(1)}, X_{(n)} \right)$, the minimal sufficient statistic for $\theta$ (where $X_{(1)} = \min_i X_i$ and $X_{(n)} = \max_i X_i$), it may be improved using the Rao–Blackwell theorem as follows:

$$\hat{\theta}_{RB} =\operatorname{E}_\theta[X_1\mid X_{(1)}, X_{( n)}] = \frac{X_{(1)}+X_{(n)}} 2.$$

However, the following unbiased estimator can be shown to have lower variance:

$$\hat{\theta}_{LV} = \frac 1 {k^2\frac{n-1}{n+1}+1} \cdot \frac{(1-k)X_{(1)} + (1+k) X_{(n)}} 2.$$

And in fact, it could be even further improved when using the following estimator:

$$\hat{\theta}_\text{BAYES}=\frac{n+1} n \left[1- \frac{\frac{X_{(1)} (1+k)}{X_{(n)} (1-k)}-1}{ \left (\frac{X_{(1)} (1+k)}{X_{(n)} (1-k)}\right )^{n+1} -1} \right] \frac{X_{(n)}}{1+k}$$

The model is a scale model. Optimal equivariant estimators can then be derived for loss functions that are invariant.

== See also ==
- Completeness (statistics)
- Sufficient statistic
- Minimum-variance unbiased estimator
- Rao–Blackwell theorem
