= Debabrata Basu =

Indian statistician

- Debabrata Basu
- Born: 5 July 1924; Dacca, British India
- Died: 24 March 2001 (aged 76); Kolkata, India
- Occupation: Statistician

Debabrata Basu (5 July 1924 – 24 March 2001) was an Indian statistician who made fundamental contributions to the foundations of statistics. Basu invented simple examples that displayed some difficulties of likelihood-based statistics and frequentist statistics; Basu's paradoxes were especially important in the development of survey sampling. In statistical theory, Basu's theorem established the independence of a complete sufficient statistic and an ancillary statistic.

Basu was associated with the Indian Statistical Institute in India, and Florida State University in the United States.

== Biography ==
Debabrata Basu was born in Dacca, Bengal, unpartitioned India, now Dhaka, Bangladesh. His father, N. M. Basu, was a mathematician specialising in number theory. Young Basu studied mathematics at Dacca University. He took a course in statistics as part of the under-graduate honours programme in Mathematics but his ambition was to become a pure mathematician. After getting his master's degree from Dacca University, Basu taught there from 1947 to 1948.

Following the partition of India in 1947, Basu made several trips to India. In 1948, he moved to Calcutta, where he worked for some time as an actuary in an insurance company. In 1950, he joined the Indian Statistical Institute as a research scholar under C.R. Rao.

In 1950, the Indian Statistical Institute was visited by Abraham Wald, who was giving a lecture tour sponsored by the International Statistical Institute. Wald greatly impressed Basu. Wald had developed a decision-theoretic foundations for statistics in which Bayesian statistics was a central part, because of Wald's theorem characterising admissible decision rules as Bayesian decision rules (or limits of Bayesian decision rules). Wald also showed the power of using measure-theoretic probability theory in statistics.

He married Kalyani Ray in 1952 and subsequently had two children, Monimala (Moni) Basu and Shantanu Basu. Moni is director of the Narrative Nonfiction Writing Program at the University of Georgia, a former journalism professor at the University of Florida and former CNN reporter, and Shantanu is an astrophysicist at the University of Western Ontario.

In 1953, after submitting his thesis to the University of Calcutta, Basu went as a Fulbright scholar to the University of California, Berkeley. There Basu had intensive discussions with Jerzy Neyman and "his brilliant younger colleagues" like Erich Leo Lehmann. Basu's theorem comes from this time. Basu thus had a good understanding of the decision-theoretic approach to statistics of Neyman, Pearson and Wald. In fact, Basu is described as having returned from Berkeley to India as a "complete Neyman Pearsonian" by J. K. Ghosh.

Basu met Ronald Fisher in the winter of 1954–1955; he wrote in 1988, "With his reference set argument, Sir Ronald was trying to find a via media between the two poles of Statistics – Berkeley and Bayes. My efforts to understand this Fisher compromise led me to the likelihood principle". In their festschrift for Basu, the editors Malay Ghosh and Patak write that

[Basu's] critical examination of both the Neyman–Pearsonian and the Fisherian modes of inference eventually forced him to a Bayesian point of view, via the likelihood route. The final conversion to Bayesianism came in January 1968, when Basu was invited to speak at a Bayesian Session in the Statistics Section of the Indian Science Congress. He confesses that, while preparing for these lectures, he became convinced that Bayesian inference did indeed provide one with a logical resolution of the underlying inconsistencies of both the Neyman–Pearson and the Fisherian theories. Since then, Dr. Basu became an ardent Bayesian and, in many of his foundation papers, pointed out the deficiencies of both the Neyman–Pearsonian and the Fisherian methods.

After 1968, Basu began writing polemical essays, which provided paradoxes to frequentist statistics, and which produced great discussion in statistical journals and at statistical meetings. Particularly stimulating papers were Basu's papers on the foundations of survey sampling. There is an extensive literature discussing Basu's problem of estimating the weight of the elephants at a circus with an enormous bull elephant named Jumbo, which Basu used to illustrate his objections to the Horvitz–Thompson estimator and to Fisher's randomisation test.

Basu taught at the Indian Statistical Institute and various universities around the world. He moved to the United States and taught statistics at Florida State University from 1975 to 1990 when he was made an emeritus professor; he has supervised six PhD students. In 1979 he was elected as a Fellow of the American Statistical Association.

== Publications ==
Basu's main articles are reprinted with his comments in Basu, D. (1988). J.K. Ghosh (ed.). Statistical information and likelihood : A collection of critical essays by Dr. D. Basu. Lecture Notes in Statistics. Vol. 45. Springer. ISBN 0-387-96751-6. MR 0953081. Also Basu, D. (September 1980). "Randomization Analysis of Experimental Data: The Fisher Randomization Test". Journal of the American Statistical Association. 75 (371): 575–582. doi:10.2307/2287648. JSTOR 2287648. MR 0590687.
