= Group family =

In probability theory, especially as it is used in statistics, a group family of probability distributions is one obtained by subjecting a random variable with a fixed distribution to a suitable transformation, such as a location–scale family, or otherwise one of probability distributions acted upon by a group. Considering a family of distributions as a group family can, in statistical theory, lead to identifying ancillary statistics.

== Types ==
A group family can be generated by subjecting a random variable with a fixed distribution to some suitable transformations. Different types of group families are as follows :

=== Location ===
This family is obtained by adding a constant to a random variable. Let $X$ be a random variable and $a \in R$ be a constant. Let $Y = X + a$ . Then $F_Y(y) = P(Y\leq y) = P(X+a \leq y) = P(X \leq y-a) = F_X(y-a)$For a fixed distribution, as $a$ varies from $-\infty$ to $\infty$, the distributions that we obtain constitute the location family.

=== Scale ===
This family is obtained by multiplying a random variable with a constant. Let $X$ be a random variable and $c \in R^+$ be a constant. Let $Y = cX$ . Then$F_Y(y) = P(Y\leq y) = P(cX \leq y) = P(X \leq y/c) = F_X(y/c)$

=== Location–scale ===
This family is obtained by multiplying a random variable with a constant and then adding some other constant to it. Let $X$ be a random variable, $a \in R$ and $c \in R^+$be constants. Let $Y = cX + a$. Then

$F_Y(y) = P(Y\leq y) = P(cX+a \leq y) = P(X \leq (y-a)/c) = F_X((y-a)/c)$

Note that it is important that $a \in R$ and $c \in R^+$ in order to satisfy the properties mentioned in the following section.

== Transformation ==
The transformation applied to the random variable must satisfy the properties of closure under composition and inversion.
