= Minimum-variance unbiased estimator =

Unbiased statistical estimator minimizing variance

In statistics a minimum-variance unbiased estimator (MVUE) or uniformly minimum-variance unbiased estimator (UMVUE) is an unbiased estimator that has lower variance than any other unbiased estimator for all possible values of the parameter.

For practical statistics problems, it is important to determine the MVUE if one exists, since less-than-optimal procedures would naturally be avoided, other things being equal. This has led to substantial development of statistical theory related to the problem of optimal estimation.

While combining the constraint of unbiasedness with the desirability metric of least variance leads to good results in most practical settings—making MVUE a natural starting point for a broad range of analyses—a targeted specification may perform better for a given problem; thus, MVUE is not always the best stopping point.

== Definition ==
Consider estimation of $g(\theta)$ based on data $X_1, X_2, \ldots, X_n$ i.i.d. from some member of a family of densities $p_\theta, \theta \in \Omega$, where $\Omega$ is the parameter space. An estimator $\delta(X_1, X_2, \ldots, X_n)$ of $g(\theta)$ is unbiased if $\operatorname{E}(\delta(X_1, X_2, \ldots, X_n))=\operatorname{E}(g(\theta))$. Furthermore, an unbiased estimator is UMVUE if $\forall \theta \in \Omega$,

$$\operatorname{var}(\delta(X_1, X_2, \ldots, X_n)) \leq \operatorname{var}(\tilde{\delta}(X_1, X_2, \ldots, X_n))$$

for any other unbiased estimator $\tilde{\delta}.$

Using the Rao–Blackwell theorem one can prove that determining the MVUE is simply a matter of finding a complete sufficient statistic for the family $p_\theta, \theta \in \Omega$ and conditioning any unbiased estimator on it.

Further, by the Lehmann–Scheffé theorem, an unbiased estimator that is a function of a complete, sufficient statistic is the UMVUE.

Put formally, suppose $\delta(X_1, X_2, \ldots, X_n)$ is unbiased for $g(\theta)$, and that $T$ is a complete sufficient statistic for the family of densities. Then

$$\eta(X_1, X_2, \ldots, X_n) = \operatorname{E}(\delta(X_1, X_2, \ldots, X_n)\mid T)\,$$

is the MVUE for $g(\theta).$

A Bayesian analog is a Bayes estimator, particularly with minimum mean square error (MMSE).

== Estimator selection ==
An efficient estimator need not exist, but if it does and if it is unbiased, it is the MVUE. Since the mean squared error (MSE) of an estimator δ is

$$\operatorname{MSE}(\delta) = \operatorname{var}(\delta) +[ \operatorname{bias}(\delta)]^2 \$$

the MVUE minimizes MSE among unbiased estimators. In some cases biased estimators have lower MSE because they have a smaller variance than does any unbiased estimator; see estimator bias.

== Example ==
Consider the data to be a single observation from an absolutely continuous distribution on $\mathbb{R}$ with density

$$p_\theta(x) = \frac{ \theta e^{-x} }{\left(1 + e^{-x}\right)^{\theta + 1} },$$

where θ > 0, and we wish to find the UMVU estimator of

$$g(\theta) = \frac 1 {\theta^2}$$

First we recognize that the density can be written as

$$\frac{ e^{-x} } { 1 + e^{-x} } \exp\left( -\theta \log(1 + e^{-x}) + \log(\theta)\right)$$

which is an exponential family with sufficient statistic $T = \log(1 + e^{-X})$. In fact this is a full rank exponential family, and therefore $T$ is complete sufficient. See exponential family for a derivation which shows

$$\operatorname{E}(T) = \frac 1 \theta,\quad \operatorname{var}(T) = \frac 1 {\theta^2}$$

Therefore,

$$\operatorname{E}(T^2) = \frac 2 {\theta^2}$$

Here we use Lehmann–Scheffé theorem to get the MVUE. Clearly, $\delta(X) = T^2/2$ is unbiased and $T = \log(1 + e^{-X})$ is complete sufficient, thus the UMVU estimator is

$$\eta(X) = \operatorname{E}(\delta(X) \mid T) = \operatorname{E} \left( \left. \frac{T^2} 2 \,\right|\, T \right) = \frac{T^2} 2 = \frac{\log\left(1 + e^{-X}\right)^2}{2}$$

This example illustrates that an unbiased function of the complete sufficient statistic will be UMVU, as Lehmann–Scheffé theorem states.

== Other examples ==
- For a normal distribution with unknown mean and variance, the sample mean and (unbiased) sample variance are the MVUEs for the population mean and population variance.
  However, the sample standard deviation is not unbiased for the population standard deviation – see unbiased estimation of standard deviation.
  Further, for other distributions the sample mean and sample variance are not in general MVUEs – for a uniform distribution with unknown upper and lower bounds, the mid-range is the MVUE for the population mean.
- If k exemplars are chosen (without replacement) from a discrete uniform distribution over the set {1, 2, ..., N} with unknown upper bound N, the MVUE for N is:
  $$\frac{k+1}{k} m - 1,$$
  where m is the sample maximum. This is a scaled and shifted (so unbiased) transform of the sample maximum, which is a sufficient and complete statistic. See German tank problem for details.

== See also ==
- Cramér–Rao bound
- Best linear unbiased estimator (BLUE)
- Bias–variance tradeoff
- Lehmann–Scheffé theorem
- U-statistic

=== Bayesian analogs ===
- Bayes estimator
- Minimum mean square error (MMSE)
