= Basu's theorem =

Theorem in statistics

In statistics, Basu's theorem states that any boundedly complete and sufficient statistic is independent of any ancillary statistic. This is a 1955 result of Debabrata Basu.

It is often used in statistics as a tool to prove independence of two statistics, by first demonstrating one is complete sufficient and the other is ancillary, then appealing to the theorem. An example of this is to show that the sample mean and sample variance of a normal distribution are independent statistics, which is done in the Example section below. This property (independence of sample mean and sample variance) characterizes normal distributions.

== Statement ==
Let $(P_\theta; \theta \in \Theta)$ be a family of distributions on a measurable space $(X, \mathcal{A})$ and a statistic $T$ maps from $(X, \mathcal{A})$ to some measurable space $(Y, \mathcal{B})$. If $T$ is a boundedly complete sufficient statistic for $\theta$, and $A$ is ancillary to $\theta$, then conditional on $\theta$, $T$ is independent of $A$. That is, $T\perp\!\!\!\perp A \mid \theta$.

=== Proof ===
Let $P_\theta^T$ and $P_\theta^A$ be the marginal distributions of $T$ and $A$ respectively.

Denote by $A^{-1}(B)$ the preimage of a set $B$ under the map $A$. For any measurable set $B \in \mathcal{B}$ we have

$$P_\theta^A(B) = P_\theta (A^{-1}(B)) = \int_{Y} P_\theta(A^{-1}(B) \mid T=t) \  P_\theta^T (dt).$$

The distribution $P_\theta^A$ does not depend on $\theta$ because $A$ is ancillary. Likewise, $P_\theta(\cdot \mid T = t)$ does not depend on $\theta$ because $T$ is sufficient. Therefore

$$\int_Y \big[ P(A^{-1}(B) \mid T=t) - P^A(B)  \big] \ P_\theta^T (dt) = 0.$$

Note the integrand (the function inside the integral) is a function of $t$ and not $\theta$. Therefore, since $T$ is boundedly complete the function

$$g(t) = P(A^{-1}(B) \mid T=t) - P^A(B)$$

is zero for $P_\theta^T$ almost all values of $t$ and thus

$$P(A^{-1}(B) \mid T=t) = P^A(B)$$

for almost all $t$. Therefore, $A$ is independent of $T$.

== Example ==
=== Independence of sample mean and sample variance of a normal distribution ===
Let X_{1}, X_{2}, ..., X_{n} be independent, identically distributed normal random variables with mean μ and variance σ^{2}.

Then with respect to the parameter μ, one can show that

$$\widehat{\mu}=\frac{\sum X_i}{n},$$

the sample mean, is a complete and sufficient statistic – it is all the information one can derive to estimate μ, and no more – and

$$\widehat{\sigma}^2=\frac{\sum \left(X_i-\bar{X}\right)^2}{n-1},$$

the sample variance, is an ancillary statistic – its distribution does not depend on μ.

Therefore, from Basu's theorem it follows that these statistics are independent conditional on $\mu$, conditional on $\sigma^2$.

This independence result can also be proven by Cochran's theorem.

Further, this property (that the sample mean and sample variance of the normal distribution are independent) characterizes the normal distribution – no other distribution has this property.
