= Bhatia =

Bhatia may refer to:

- Bhatia caste, an Indian caste
- Bhatia–Davis inequality, a mathematic equation

== People ==
Bhatia is a surname of Indian origin. Notable people with the surname include:

- Aditi Bhatia (born 1999), Indian actress
- Ajit Bhatia (born 1936), Indian cricketer
- Akshay Bhatia (born 2002), American golfer
- Akshay Kumar (born Rajiv Hari Om Bhatia 1967), Indian actor and film producer
- Amin Bhatia (born 1961), British music composer and producer
- Amir Bhatia, Baron Bhatia (1932–2024), British businessman, life peer
- Amit Bhatia (born 1979), British-Indian businessman
- Anand Bhatia (born 1947), Indian cricketer
- Ankur Bhatia (born 1980), Indian actor and model
- Avadh Bhatia (1921–1984), Indian-Canadian physicist
- Balwinder Kaur Bhatia (born 1958), Indian field hockey player
- Bela Bhatia, Indian lawyer, writer, scholar and activist
- Bhavesh Bhatia (born 1970), Indian entrepreneur and sportsman
- Bir Bhan Bhatia (1900–1962), Indian doctor
- Deepa Bhatia, Indian film editor, producer and director
- Dilpreet Bhatia, Indian singer and songwriter
- Durgadas Bhatia (1909–1972), Indian politician
- Eduardo Bhatia (born 1964), Puerto Rican politician and lawyer
- Gautam Bhatia (born 1952), Indian architect, writer and artist
- Gautam Bhatia (born 1988), Indian lawyer and constitutional scholar
- Harpreet Singh Bhatia (born 1991), Indian cricketer
- Jass Bhatia (born 1988), Indian actor and model
- Jayati Bhatia (born 1970), Indian actress
- Karan Bhatia, American attorney
- Kavitha Bhatia, American physician
- Madan Bhatia (1929–2013), Indian lawyer and parliamentarian
- Madhuri Bhatia (born 1930), Indian actress
- Maya Bhatia (died 2023), Canadian biogeochemist
- Michael Bhatia (1976–2008), American researcher
- Milli Bhatia (born 1992/1993), English Theatre director
- Nav Bhatia (born 1951), Canadian businessman, superfan
- Peter Bhatia, American journalist
- Pratipal Bhatia (1936–2024), Indian historian and numismatist
- Prem Bhatia (1922–1995), Indian diplomat and journalist
- Prem Bhatia (1940–2018), Indian cricketer
- Prem Kumar Bhatia (born 1937), Indian mathematician, astrophysicist and professor
- Rachit Bhatia (born 1997), Indian cricketer
- Rafiq Bhatia (born 1987), American musician, composer, guitarist, producer.
- Rajat Bhatia (born 1979), Indian cricketer
- Rajendra Bhatia (born 1952), Indian mathematician
- Raj Kumar Bhatia, Indian politician
- Ramesh Bhatia (born 1940), Indian cricketer
- Ranjit Bhatia (1936–2014), Indian athlete and journalist
- Ravi Bhatia, Indian actor
- Riya Bhatia (born 1997), Indian tennis player
- R. L. Bhatia (1921–2021), Indian political figure
- Ruby Bhatia (born 1973), Canadian actress, television personality
- Sabeer Bhatia (born 1968), Indian businessman, co-founder of Hotmail
- Sagar Bhatia, Indian singer and composer
- Saket Bhatia (born 1978), Indian cricketer
- Sanyukta Bhatia (born 1946), Indian politician
- Sangeeta Bhatia (born 1968), American biological engineer
- Sanjay Bhatia (born 1960), Indian bureaucrat
- Sanjay Bhatia (born 1967), Indian parliamentarian
- Sheila Bhatia (1916–2008), Indian poet and playwright
- Shital Bhatia, Indian film producer
- Shyam Bhatia (born 1950), Indian journalist, writer and war reporter
- Smita Bhatia, American oncologist
- Sohan Lal Bhatia (1891–1981), Indian Army officer and physiologist
- Soma Bhatia, Canadian actress and singer
- Suresh Kumar Bhatia (born 1952), Australian chemical engineer
- Surita Bhatia, American chemist
- Tamannaah Bhatia (born 1989), Indian actress
- Taniya Bhatia (born 1997), Indian cricketer
- Tanvi Bhatia, Indian actress
- Tina Bhatia, Indian actress
- Vanraj Bhatia (1927–2021), Indian music composer
- Vineet Bhatia (born 1967), British chef and author
- Vinod Bhatia, Indian air force officer
- Virendra Bhatia (1947–2010), Indian politician
- Vishal Bhatia (born 1981), Indian cricketer
- Yastika Bhatia (born 2000), Indian cricketer

== See also ==
- Bhati (disambiguation)
- Bhatti (disambiguation)
- Bhutta (disambiguation)
- Bhutto (disambiguation)
- Bhatt, an Indian surname
