= Bhutta =

Bhutta may refer to:

== People with the surname ==
- Bhutta (surname)
- Muhammad Umar Bhutta (born 1992), Pakistani field hockey player
- Peerzada Mian Shahzad Maqbool Bhutta (born 1982), Pakistani politician
- Naseer Ahmed Bhutta, Pakistani lawyer
- Zulfiqar Bhutta, Pakistani-born physician

== Places ==
- Bhutta (Ludhiana East), a village in Punjab, India
- Bhutta Village, a fishing village in Karachi, Pakistan
- Kot Bhutta, a village in Punjab, Pakistan

== See also ==
- Bhoot (disambiguation)
- Bhutto (disambiguation), a Muslim Rajput clan in Sindh, Pakistan
- Bhatti (disambiguation)
- Bhatia (disambiguation)
- Bhat, an Indian surname
- Bhutan
- Bhuttar, Nepal
