= Bhati (disambiguation) =

Bhati is a social group of India and Pakistan.

Bhati may also refer to:

== Places ==
- Bhati (region), a region of medieval Bengal
- Bhati, Delhi, a census town in India
- Bhati, Maharashtra, a village in India

== People with the name ==
- Bhati (surname)

== See also ==
- Bhatti (disambiguation)
- Bhutto (disambiguation)
- Bhutta (disambiguation)
- Bhatia (disambiguation)
- Bhat, an Indian surname
