= Bhutta (surname) =

Clan and surname in Punjab, Pakistan

- بُھٹّہ
- Religions: Islam
- Languages: Punjabi, Saraiki
- Country: Pakistan
- Region: Punjab
- Ethnicity: Punjabi, Saraiki
- Family names: yes

Bhutta is a Jat Muslim surname mainly found in Punjab region of Pakistan.

== Notable people ==
People with the surname Bhutta, who may or may not be associated with the Jats, include:

- Naseer Ahmed Bhutta, former member National Assembly of Pakistan (2008 - 2013)
- Peerzada Mian Shahzad Maqbool Bhutta, member Provincial Assembly of the Punjab (2013 - 2018)
- Zulfiqar Bhutta, academic and scientist
- Muhammad Umar Bhutta, former Pakistani field hockey Olympic player

== See also ==
- Bhutta (disambiguation)
