= Bhavesh =

Bhawesh
- Gender: Male
- Language: Sanskrit

Origin
- Origin: Gujarat, Madhya Pradesh, Maharashtra, Bihar
- Meaning: Lord of emotion Lord of the wisdom Lord of existence
- Region of origin: India

Other names
- Variant forms: Bhawesh, Bhavash
- Related names: Bhavya

Bhavesh or Bhavish or Bhawesh (भावेश, ભાવેશ) is an Indian male given name. It supposedly originates from the Sanskrit words bhāva, which means "existence", and eesh, which means "Ishvara" ईश्वर "Lord, Ruler". It means "Lord Shiva" as well.

- Bhavish Aggarwal (born 1985), Indian entrepreneur
- Bhavesh Baria (born 1990), Indian cricketer
- Bhavesh Bhatia (born 1970), Indian entrepreneur
- Bhavesh Bhatt (born 1975), Indian poet
- Bhavesh Patel (disambiguation), multiple people
- Bhavesh Seth (born 1997), Indian cricketer
