= NWC =

NWC may stand for:

- NASCAR Winston Cup
- National War College
- National Weather Center
- National Whistleblower Center
- National Working Committee
- National Wrestling Conference, wrestling promotion
- Native wifi calling, direct support in mobile OS for VoWifi
- Naval War College
- Netball World Championships
- Network-centric warfare
- Net working capital
- New World Computing
- Nintendo Wi-Fi Connection
- Nintendo World Championships
- Norbert Wiener Center for Harmonic Analysis and Applications
- Northwest Caucasian languages
- Northwestern College (Iowa)
- Northwestern College (Minnesota)
- Northwestern College (Wisconsin) now part of Martin Luther College
- Northwest Conference
- Northwest College in Powell, Wyoming
- North West Company
- NoteWorthy Composer, a graphical score editor (software used for creating sheet music) or its .nwc file extension.
