= Bhoot =

Bhoot may refer to:

- Bhoota (supernatural), the ghost of a deceased person or a disembodied spirit in the Indian subcontinent
- Bhoot (film), a 2003 Indian horror film
  - Bhoot Returns, its 2012 sequel
  - Bhoot – Part One: The Haunted Ship, a 2020 Bollywood film starring Vicky Kaushal, spinoff of the 2003 film
- Mahābhūta, classical elements in Hindu and Buddhist philosophy also represented by the name Bhuta-Shakti or primordial states of matter and the connected spirits
- Bhut jolokia, ghost pepper
- Bhut, Nawanshahr, a village in Shaheed Bhagat Singh Nagar district of Punjab State, India

== See also ==
- Bhutta (disambiguation)
- Bhot, a people of Himachal Pradesh, India
- Bhoti (disambiguation)
