= Alexandru Ioan Lupaș =

Romanian mathematician

- Born: 5 January 1942; Arad, Kingdom of Romania
- Died: 14 August 2007 (aged 65); Sibiu, Romania
- Education: University of Stuttgart; Babeș-Bolyai University
- Scientific career
- Fields: Mathematics
- Workplaces: Babeș-Bolyai University; Lucian Blaga University of Sibiu
- Doctoral advisor: Werner Meyer-König; Friedrich Moritz Lösch; Tiberiu Popoviciu; Dimitrie D. Stancu

Alexandru Ioan Lupaș (5 January 1942 – 14 August 2007) was a Romanian mathematician.

He was born in Arad, where he attended the Moise Nicoară High School. He pursued his studies at Babeș-Bolyai University in Cluj, obtaining a B.S. degree in Mathematics in 1964. He earned a Ph.D. degree in 1972 from the University of Stuttgart, under the direction of Werner Meyer-König and Friedrich Moritz Lösch.

Lupaș then returned to work at Babeș-Bolyai University, obtaining a second Ph.D. degree in 1976 under the supervision of Tiberiu Popoviciu and Dimitrie D. Stancu. That year he moved to Lucian Blaga University of Sibiu, starting as lecturer and advancing to full professor in 1990. He died in Sibiu.
