= Bhattian (disambiguation) =

Bhattian is a village in the Phillaur tehsil of Jalandhar district, Punjab, India.

Bhattian may also refer to:

- Bhattian (Ludhiana West), a village located in the Ludhiana West tehsil of Ludhiana district, Punjab, India

== See also ==
- Bhatti (disambiguation)
- Bhattiana, tract of land in the Indian states of Punjab and Haryana
- Jalalpur Bhattian, a city in the Hafizabad District of Punjab, Pakistan
- Pindi Bhattian, a city in Punjab, Pakistan
