= Chandler Davis =

Canadian mathematician and writer (1926–2022)

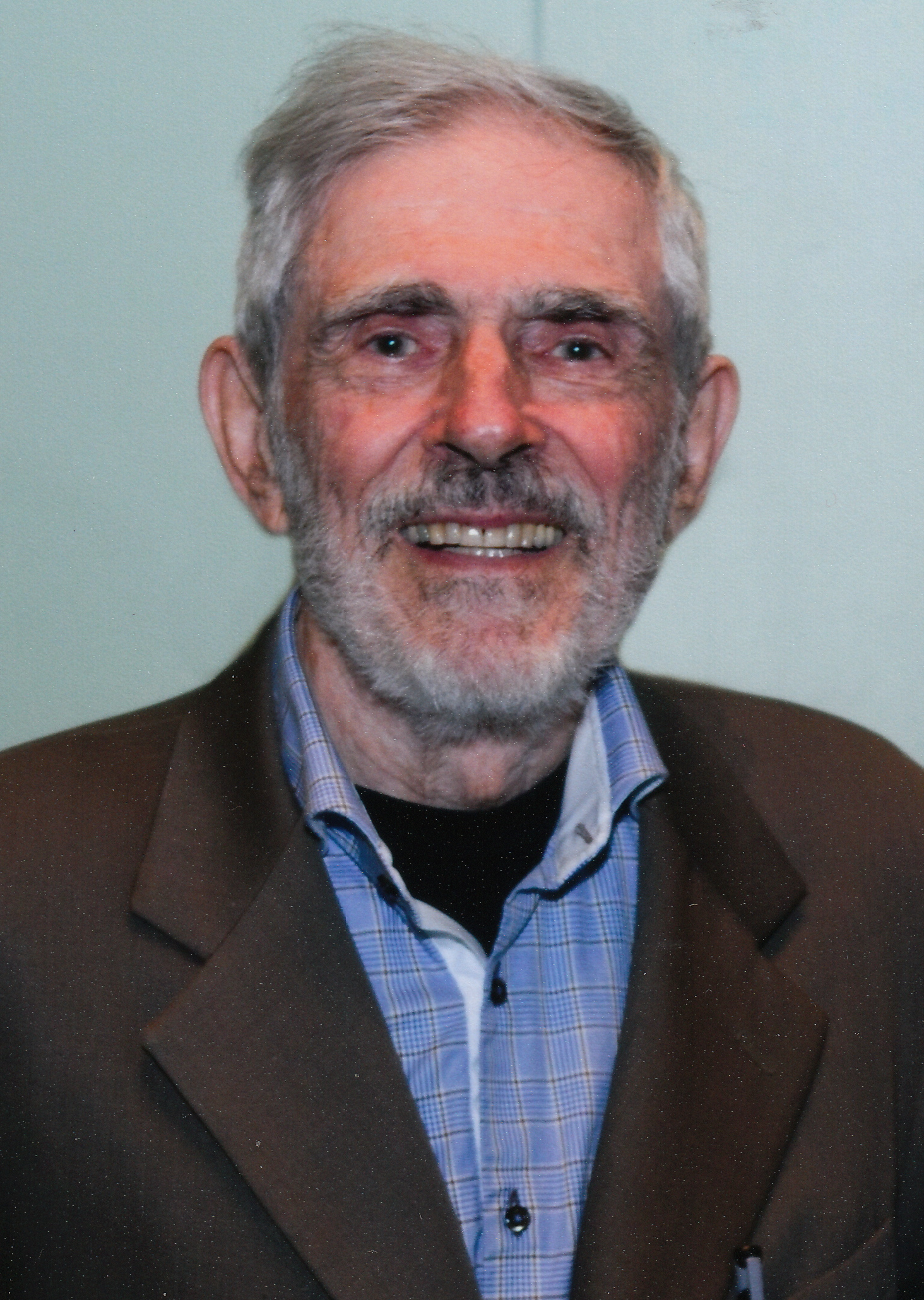
- Davis in 2011
- Born: Horace Chandler Davis; August 12, 1926; Ithaca, New York, U.S.
- Died: September 24, 2022 (aged 96); Toronto, Canada
- Education: Harvard University
- Spouse: Natalie Zemon Davis
- Children: 3
- Scientific career
- Fields: Mathematics
- Workplaces: University of Toronto
- Thesis: Lattices and Modal Operators (1950)
- Doctoral advisor: Garrett Birkhoff
- Doctoral students: John Benedetto; Mehdi Radjabalipour; Man-Duen Choi

Horace Chandler Davis (August 12, 1926 – September 24, 2022) was an American-Canadian mathematician, writer, educator, and left-wing political activist. The socialist magazine Jacobin described Davis as "an internationally esteemed mathematician, a minor science fiction writer of note, and among the most celebrated political prisoners in the United States during the years of the high Cold War".

== Background ==
Horace Chandler Davis, known as "Chan" by friends, was born on August 12, 1926, in Ithaca, New York, to parents Horace Bancroft Davis and Marian Rubins, both members of the Communist Party USA (CPUSA). He joined the Young Pioneers of America while in elementary school. Because of their politics, his parents moved frequently, so that Davis spent a year of his childhood in Brazil. In 1942, age 16, he received a Harvard National Scholarship. At Harvard, he joined the Astounding Science-Fiction Fanclub, whose members included John B. Michel, Frederik Pohl, Isaac Asimov, and Donald Wollheim. In 1943, Davis joined the Communist Party USA but left soon after so he could join the U.S. Navy for officers training. In 1945, Davis graduated Harvard early and also received a commission from Naval Reserve Midshipman's School and spent a year in the U.S. Navy as a minesweeper. In 1946, he returned to Harvard as a graduate student in mathematics, rejoined the CPUSA, and joined the Federation of American Scientists, founded by former members of the Manhattan Project. In 1948, he supported Henry A. Wallace, Progressive Party candidate for the 1948 United States presidential election. In 1950, Davis received a doctorate in mathematics from Harvard University.

== Career ==
In 1950, Davis turned down an offer from the University of California Los Angeles (UCLA) due to loyalty oath requirements and accepted a position as instructor at the University of Michigan (UM). Davis left the CPUSA the following year.

In 1953, Davis received a subpoena to appear before the House Un-American Activities Committee (HUAC). In 1954, UM suspended Davis, Clement Markert, and Mark Nickerson for refusing to cooperate with HUAC hearings held in Lansing, Michigan. Makert and Nickerson pled under the Fifth Amendment (right to avoid self-incrimination), while Davis pled the First Amendment (right to free speech). He hoped to establish a precedent that HUAC could not question witnesses on their political affiliations, but the U.S. Supreme Court in 1959 refused to hear his case. After years of appeals, in 1960, Davis received a six-month jail sentence, served at a prison in Danbury, Connecticut.

In 1962, Davis accepted a teaching position at the University of Toronto. He specialized in algebra and operator theory (a branch of functional analysis).

In 1968, the Warsaw Pact invasion of Czechoslovakia ended Davis's CPUSA membership for good. He remained a political activist. For example, in 1971, he traveled to North Vietnam with other mathematicians including Laurent Schwartz. He also was an advocate for Palestinian rights. In July 2022, he publicly supported Russian mathematician Azat Miftakhov.

=== Mathematics ===
Davis's principal research investigations involved linear algebra and operator theory in Hilbert spaces. Furthermore, he made contributions to numerical analysis, geometry, and algebraic logic. He is one of the eponyms of the Davis–Kahan theorem and Bhatia–Davis inequality (along with Rajendra Bhatia). The Davis–Kahan–Weinberger dilation theorem is one of the landmark results in the dilation theory of Hilbert space operators and has found applications in many different areas. A PhD thesis titled "Backward Perturbation and Sensitivity Analysis of Structured Polynomial Eigenomial Eigenvalue Problem" is dedicated to this theorem. Davis wrote around eighty research papers in mathematics.

Davis was a professor in the mathematics department of University of Michigan, working alongside Wilfred Kaplan. In the Mathematics Genealogy Project, he is listed as having 15 PhD (1964–2001), and 213 PhD descendants of his former doctoral students, with 107 being of them from his student John Benedetto (PhD 1964).

He was one of the co-editors-in-chief of the Mathematical Intelligencer. In 2012 he became a fellow of the American Mathematical Society. He was part of the 2019 class of fellows of the Association for Women in Mathematics.

=== Fiction ===
Davis began his writing career in Astounding Science Fiction in 1946. From 1946 through 1962 he produced a spate of science fiction stories, mostly published there. One of the earliest, published May 1946, was The Nightmare, later the lead story in A Treasury of Science Fiction, edited by Groff Conklin; it argued for a national policy of decentralizing industry to evade nuclear attacks by terrorists. He also issued the fanzine "Blitherings" in the 1940s.

He attended Torcon I, the 6th World Science Fiction Convention in 1948, appeared at the 2010 SFContario science fiction convention, and was Science Guest of Honor at the 2013 SFContario science fiction convention.

=== Politics ===
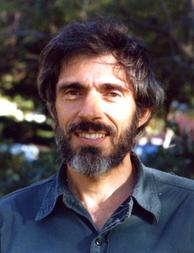
Davis in 1975.

Davis came from a radical family and identified himself as a socialist and former member of the Communist Party of America.

Davis—along with two other professors, Mark Nickerson and Clement Markert—refused to cooperate with the House Unamerican Activities Committee and was subsequently dismissed from the University of Michigan. Davis was then sentenced to a six-month prison term where he was able to do some research. A paper from this era has the following acknowledgement:

Research supported in part by the Federal Prison System. Opinions expressed in this paper are the author's and are not necessarily those of the Bureau of Prisons.

The Federal government released Davis from prison in 1960. After his release, Davis moved to Canada, where he worked at the University of Toronto. He also opposed the Vietnam War and was chair of the Toronto Anti-Draft Committee.

In 1991, the University of Michigan Senate initiated the annual Davis, Markert, Nickerson Lecture on Academic and Intellectual Freedom. Recent speakers have included: Cass Sunstein (2008), Nadine Strossen (2007), Bill Keller (2006), Floyd Abrams (2005), and Noam Chomsky (2004).

== Personal life and death ==
In 1948, Davis married Natalie Zemon Davis (author of the book and co-scriptwriter of the movie The Return of Martin Guerre); they had three children.

H. Chandler Davis died on September 24, 2022.

== Honors ==
Three mathematical theorems are named in Davis's honor: the Davis–Kahan theorem on how eigenspaces of an operator change under perturbation; the Bhatia–Davis inequality, bounding the variance of a given probability distribution on the real line; and the Davis–Kahan–Weinberger theorem on norm-preserving dilations of Hilbert space operators.

A lecture in honor of his stand for his beliefs is now held at the University of Michigan, which had fired him.

== Legacy ==
At his death, long-time friend Alan M. Wald wrote, "Chan Davis, who died last month at the age of 96, faced down McCarthyite blacklists and imprisonment to pursue a brilliant academic career. Davis knew how to change and learn from political experience, but he always remained loyal to his socialist principles."

== Works ==
Books Edited

- Linear Algebra and Its Application
- Geometric Vein: The Coxeter Festschrift with Branko Grünbaum
- Coxeter Legacy: Reflections and Projections with Erich W. Ellers (2006)
- Shape of Content: Creative Writing in Mathematics and Science with Marjorie Wikler Senechal and Jan Zwicky (2008)

Poetry

- Having Come This Far (1986)

Prose

- It Walks in Beauty: Selected Prose of Chandler Davis (2010)

Journals Edited

- The Mathematical Intelligencer

== External sources ==
- Biography at the University of Regina's Department of Mathematics & Statistics
- Chan Davis at the Internet Speculative Fiction Database
- Davis, Markert, Nickerson Lecture Series on Academic and Intellectual Freedom
- Chandler Davis at the Mathematics Genealogy Project
- Victim of McCarthy-Era Witch Hunt calls on U-Illinois not to Fire Critic of Israeli Policies
- Chandler Davis archival papers held at the University of Toronto Archives and Records Management Services
