= Butto =

Butto may refer to:

- José Butto, Venezuelan professional baseball player
- Buttō, a Japanese pagoda

== See also ==
- Bhutto (disambiguation)
