= Lupaș =

Lupaș is a Romanian surname. Notable people with the surname include:

- Alexandru Ioan Lupaș (1942–2007), Romanian mathematician
- Andrei Lupaș (1963-), Romanian-German biochemist
- Ioan Lupaș (1880–1967), Austro-Hungarian-born Romanian historian, academic, politician, Orthodox theologian, and priest
