= Bhutto =

Bhutto most often refers to:

- Bhutto (clan), a Pakistan social group
- Bhutto family, a political family in Sindh, Pakistan
  - Benazir Bhutto (1953–2007), Pakistani prime minister
  - Zulfikar Ali Bhutto (1928–1979), Pakistani barrister and prime minister

Bhutto may also refer to:

- Ameer Buksh Khan Bhutto (born 1955), Pakistani politician
- Asadullah Bhutto, incumbent Ameer of Jamaat-e-Islami Sindh
- Dua Bhutto, Pakistani politician
- Fatima Bhutto (born 1982), Pakistani writer
- Ghinwa Bhutto, Pakistani politician
- Jawaid Bhutto (1954–2019), professor and Sindhi intellectual
- Mahreen Razaque Bhutto, Pakistani politician
- Mumtaz Bhutto (1933–2021), Pakistani politician
- Murtaza Bhutto (1954–1996), Pakistani politician
- Muzafar Bhutto (1970–2012), Sindhi nationalist politician
- Nusrat Bhutto (1929–2011), Pakistani Iranian-Kurdish public figure
- Shah Nawaz Bhutto (1888–1957), politician in British India
- Shahid Hussain Bhutto, Pakistani politician
- Shahnawaz Bhutto (1958–1985), son of Zulfikar Ali Bhutto
- Wahid Baksh Bhutto (1898–1931), Indian politician

== See also ==
- Bhutta (disambiguation)
- Bhatti (disambiguation)
- Bhati (disambiguation)
- Bhatia (disambiguation)
- Bhat, an Indian surname
