= Elena Moldovan Popoviciu =

Romanian mathematician

Elena Moldovan Popoviciu (26 August 1924–24 June 2009) was a Romanian mathematician known for her work in functional analysis and specializing in generalizations of the concept of a convex function. She was a winner of the Simion Stoilow Prize in mathematics.

== Education and career ==
Elena Moldovan was born in Cluj to Ioan Moldovan and his wife, Rozalia. She studied mathematics at the Victor Babeș University in Cluj, earning a bachelor's degree there in 1947; afterwards, she became a schoolteacher. She returned to the university for doctoral study in the early 1950s, initially working with Grigore Calugăreanu, but she soon came under the influence of Tiberiu Popoviciu and began working with him in functional analysis. She completed her Ph.D. in 1960. Her dissertation, Sets of Interpolating Functions And The Notion of Convex Function, was supervised by Popoviciu. She married Popoviciu in 1964, remained at the university, and became a full professor there in 1969.

During her career, she supervised the Ph.D. thesis of 23 students. She served as the second editor-in-chief of the journal Revue d’Analyse Numérique et de Théorie de l’Approximation, founded in 1972 by her husband.

She died in Cluj-Napoca on June 24, 2009.

== Recognition ==
Popoviciu won the Simion Stoilow Prize of the Romanian Academy, for her achievements in mathematics, in 1972. A conference in honor of Popoviciu's 75th birthday was held in 1999 at the Babeș-Bolyai University in Cluj, and a second conference in her honor was held five years later.
