= Moise Nicoară National College =

High school in Arad County, Romania

Coordinates: 46°10′16″N 21°19′09″E

Moise Nicoară National College Romanian: Colegiul Național "Moise Nicoară"
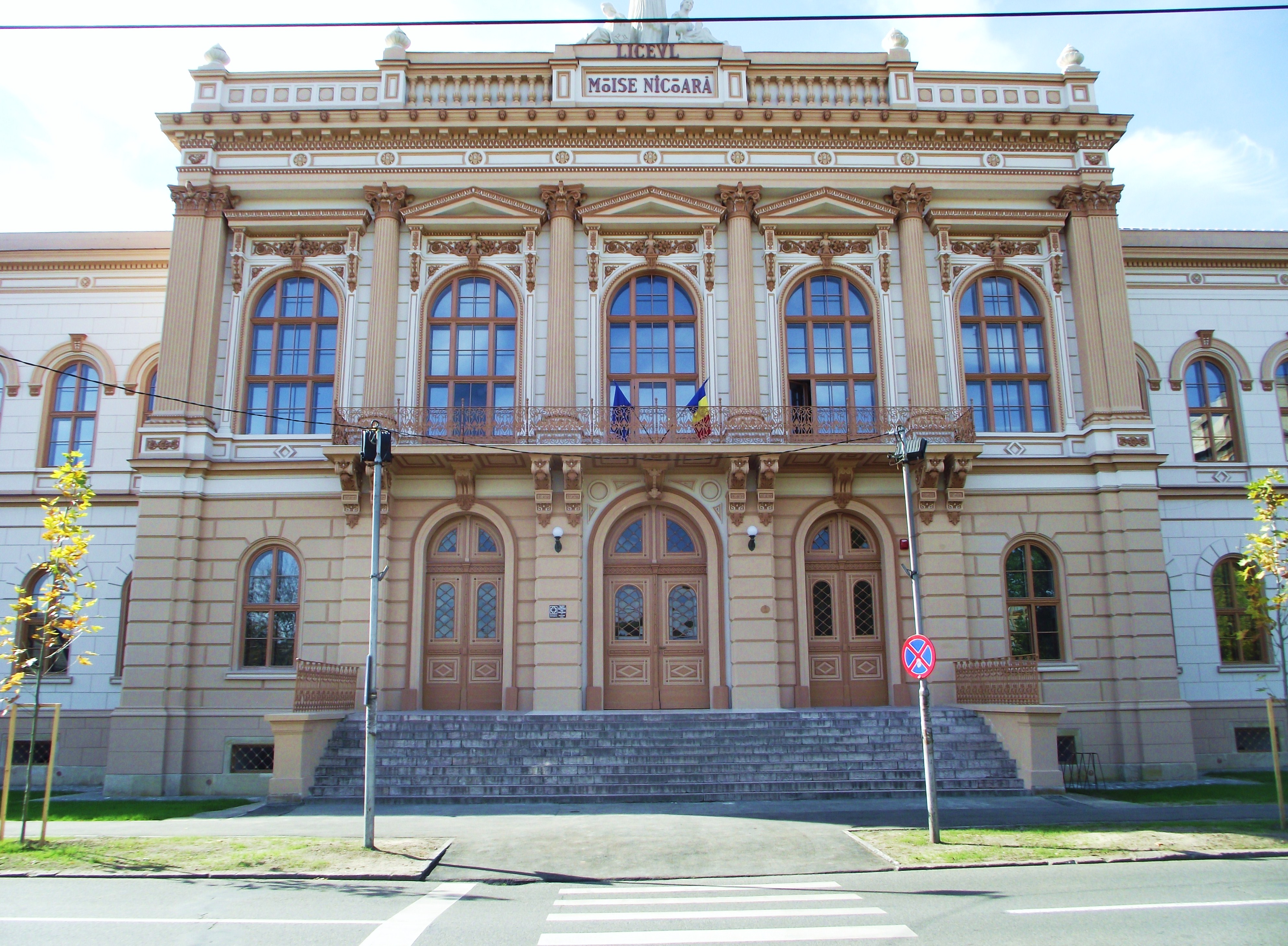

Information
- Established: 1873; 152 years ago

Moise Nicoară National College (Romanian: Colegiul Național "Moise Nicoară") is a public day high school in Arad, Romania.

== History ==
Opened in 1873, the school building was erected over the previous four years, during the Austro-Hungarian period. In October 1919, following the union of Transylvania with Romania, the school acquired its present name, after the 19th century cultural figure and patriot Moise Nicoară, and became the first Romanian-language boys' high school in Arad. The building became the property of the Romanian state in 1934, and was declared a historic monument in 1955. In 1948, following the advent of the Communist regime and subsequent education reform, the institution became known as Arad Middle School nr. 1, the name Ioan Slavici being added in 1957. It became a high school once again in 1965 and readopted the Nicoară name in 1991. It was accorded the "national college" distinction in 2000. The building underwent a thorough restoration that culminated with its reopening in 2013, at which point it was one of the country's most modern high school structures.

== Teachers ==
- Perpessicius, literary historian and critic
- Al. T. Stamatiad, poet

== Alumni ==
- Mihai Beniuc, poet
- Mathias Bernath, historian
- Ovidiu Cotruș, essayist
- Ștefan Augustin Doinaș, poet
- Sofronie Drincec, bishop
- Ilarion Felea, priest
- Tudor Gheorghe, musician
- Vasile Goldiș, politician
- Caius Iacob, mathematician
- Alexandru Ioan Lupaș, mathematician
- Atanasie Marian Marienescu, ethnographer
- Teodor Meleșcanu, politician
- Mihail Neamțu, politician
- Moise Nicoară, lawyer
- Valeriu Novacu, physicist and politician
- Tiberiu Popoviciu, mathematician
- Ioan Slavici, writer
- Ioan Suciu, lawyer and politician
- Mircea Zaciu, critic
