= Tiberiu Popoviciu Institute of Numerical Analysis =

Research institute in Romania

Tiberiu Popoviciu Institute of Numerical Analysis (Romanian Academy)
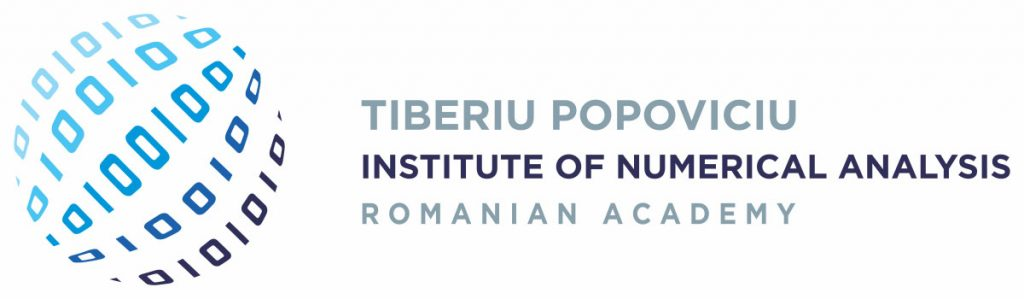
- Founder: Tiberiu Popoviciu
- Established: 1951
- Focus: Numerical Analysis
- Owner: Romanian Academy
- Address: Str. Fântânele nr. 57, ap. 67-68, 400320
- Location: Cluj-Napoca, Romania
- Coordinates: 46°45′56″N 23°32′53″E
- Interactive map of Tiberiu Popoviciu Institute of Numerical Analysis (Romanian Academy)
- Website: www.ictp.acad.ro

The Tiberiu Popoviciu Institute of Numerical Analysis Romanian: Institutul de Calcul "Tiberiu Popoviciu" (ICTP) is a mathematics research institute of the Romanian Academy, based in Cluj-Napoca, Romania.

ICTP is coordinated by the Mathematical Section and belongs to the Cluj-Napoca Branch of the Romanian Academy. The Institute performs fundamental research mainly in the field of Numerical Analysis.

ICTP was founded in 1951, as the Mathematical Section of the Cluj-Napoca Branch, with residence at 37 Republicii Street.
