= Eigengap =

Difference between successive eigenvalues

In linear algebra, the eigengap of a linear operator is the difference between two successive eigenvalues, where eigenvalues are sorted in ascending order.

The Davis–Kahan theorem, named after Chandler Davis and William Kahan, uses the eigengap to show how eigenspaces of an operator change under perturbation. Essentially, a larger eigengap indicates that the corresponding eigenvectors are more robust and less sensitive to small changes or noise in the data.

In spectral clustering, the eigengap is often referred to as the spectral gap; although the spectral gap may often be defined in a broader sense than that of the eigengap. In this context, a significant jump or gap between successive eigenvalues often suggests a natural division in the underlying data structure, helping to determine the ideal number of clusters.

== See also ==
- Eigenvalue perturbation
- Spectral gap
