= Tiberiu Popoviciu High School of Computer Science =

High school

Coordinates: 46°45′14″N 23°35′42″E

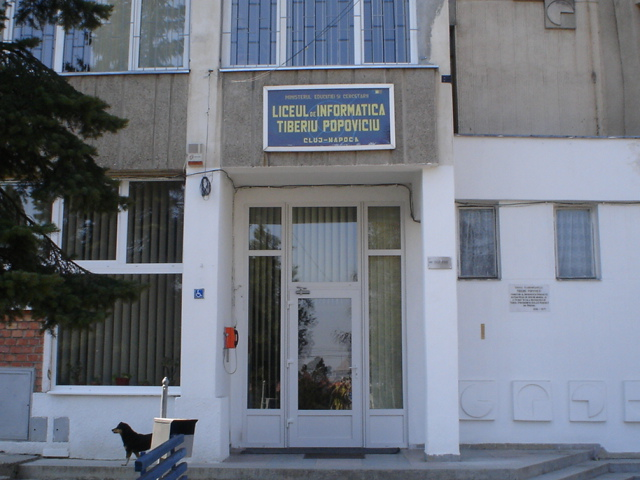
Tiberiu Popoviciu High School's main entrance

Tiberiu Popoviciu High School of Computer Science (Romanian: Liceul de Informatică "Tiberiu Popoviciu") is located at 140–142 Calea Turzii in Cluj-Napoca, Romania.

The high school was founded in 1971, together with three other similar high schools in Bucharest, Iași, and Timișoara. Since 1993 it holds the name of mathematician Tiberiu Popoviciu (1906–1975), known for establishing the academic field of computer science in Romania.
