= Ilarion Felea =

Romanian priest, theologian, and saint

Saint Ilarion Felea
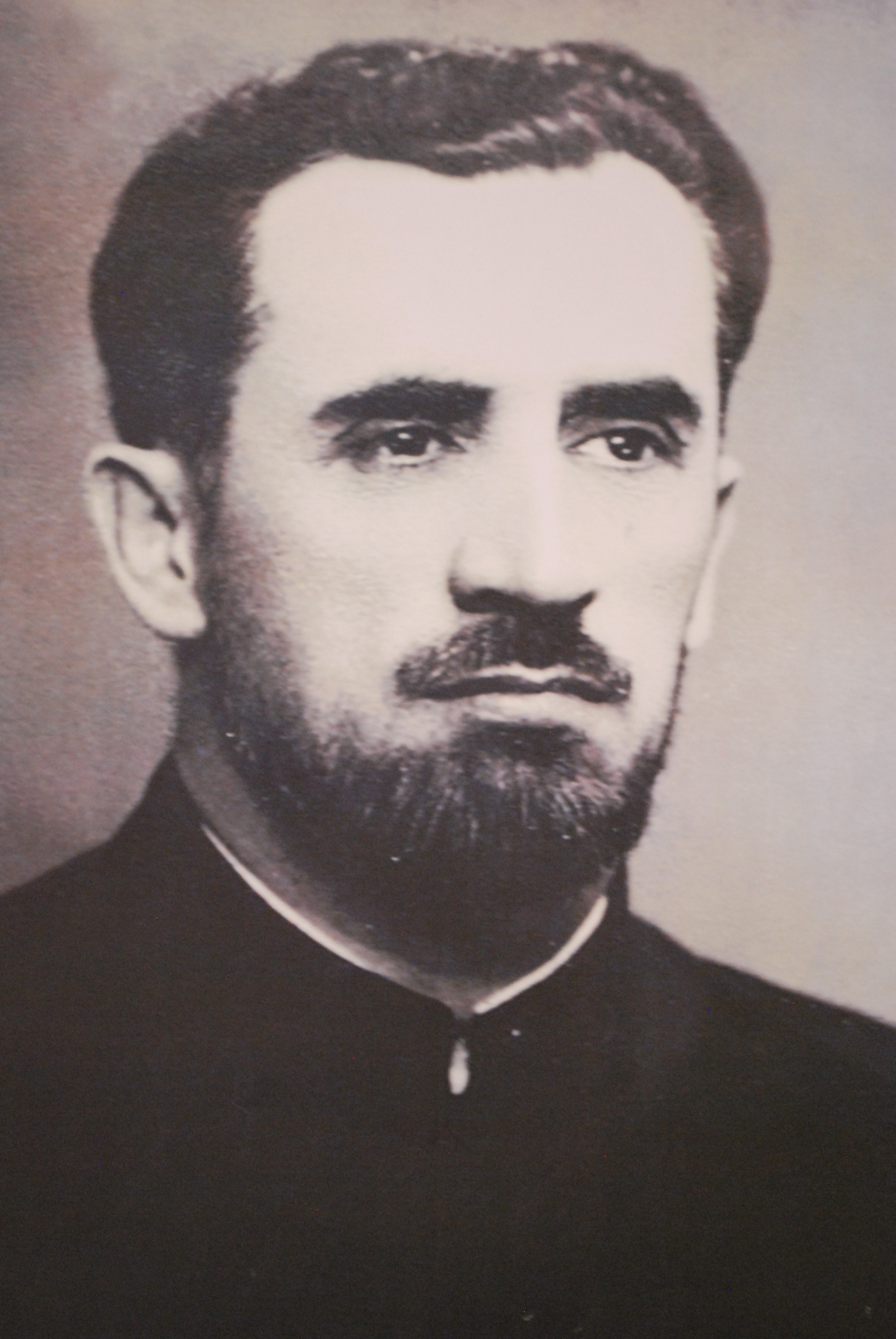
- Born: March 21, 1903; Brad, Hunedoara
- Died: 18 September 1961 (aged 58); Aiud Prison
- Honored in: Eastern Orthodox Church
- Canonized: February 4, 2025 by Romanian Orthodox Church

Ilarion V. Felea (March 21, 1903 – September 18, 1961) was a priest and theologian of the Romanian Orthodox Church.

== Life ==
Felea was born in Valea Bradului, a village that today is incorporated into Brad city in Hunedoara County. His father was a priest. From 1910 to 1914, he attended primary school in his native village, followed from 1914 to 1920 by Avram Iancu High School in Brad. From 1920 to 1922, by which time his native Transylvania has united with Romania, he attended Moise Nicoară National College in Arad, taking his degree there. Felea studied at the theological academy in Sibiu from 1922 to 1926, earning his diploma at the end. From 1926 to 1927, he was a substitute teacher at Avram Iancu in Brad. In July 1927, he was ordained a priest for the Sibiu Archdiocese, and was soon assigned to the parish in his native village. He continued there for three years, when he entered the Arad Diocese and was assigned a parish in the city's Șega neighborhood. From 1927 to 1929, he attended the literature and philosophy faculty at the University of Cluj, from which he graduated.

Felea remained at Șega for nine years, in charge of the church and small parish house; the parishioners were mainly workers at nearby factories. The church building was new and unfinished, and he helped complete, bless and furnish it. Meanwhile, he continued to study theology and to write, having been published since 1924. In 1932, he took a degree from the theology faculty of the University of Bucharest, earning a doctorate in 1939. His contributions appeared in Revista Teologică, Telegraful Român, Lumina satelor and Oastea Domnului (Sibiu), Biserica și Școala, Apărarea Națională, Aradul and Granița (Arad), Renașterea (Cluj), Viața ilustrată (Sibiu and Cluj) and Zărandul (Brad). During the 1930s, he also published a number of theological studies and generalist pamphlets. In 1937–38, he was substitute professor at the Cluj theological academy. In January 1939, he was named priest at the Arad cathedral, remaining there until September 1942. In 1938, he was appointed professor at the dogmatics and apologetics department of the Arad theological academy, where he taught until it was shut down in 1948. Between 1947 and 1948, he served as rector. He edited Biserica și Școala magazine from 1939 to 1945, and was also in charge of Calea mântuirii, a bulletin for parishioners, from 1943 to 1945. In both these journals, he wrote a number of articles on theology and church life, as well as book reviews. Felea's sermons, invariably well prepared and relevant, attracted a number of intellectuals, with whom he developed close relations.

On March 3, 1945, days before the imposition of a Romanian Communist Party-led government, he was arrested together with a group of other religious figures and sent to the Caracal labor camp until that July. Although a full-fledged communist regime was set up in late 1947, Felea tended to ignore the new political reality, preaching the mission of the church and denouncing the abuses of the new authorities. His sermons attracted increasing numbers of people unhappy with the regime, drawing the latter's ire. On January 6, 1949, after finishing the blessing of homes for the Theophany, he was again arrested. He was taken to a crowded basement for questioning and sometimes held alone in a cell for political prisoners on an upper floor. Transferred to the Timișoara penitentiary, he was tried in October 1949 and sentenced to a year's imprisonment for "failure to denounce". He also passed through Aiud prison, from which he was released in January 1950.

After being freed, he worked at the diocesan library in Arad, and in July 1952 was reinstated at the Arad cathedral. In September 1958, Felea was arrested by the Securitate secret police and transported to the Interior Ministry in Bucharest, where he was subjected to a harsh interrogation. He was then taken to Cluj, where he was tried in secret on the basis of unfounded allegations together with six other Arad priests. In March 1959, the Cluj military tribunal sentenced him to 20 years' hard labor and eight years' loss of civic rights for "conspiracy against the social order" and to 20 years' imprisonment for "intensive activity against the working class and the revolutionary movement". Initially held at Gherla Prison, he was then taken to Aiud Prison, where he died in 1961. The cause of death was a rapidly progressing colon cancer that was left untreated; he was buried in a common grave for prisoners.

Felea was married and had two sons, one of whom died young. A gymnasium in Arad bears his name, and the Arad theological faculty was named in his honor following the Romanian Revolution.

== Veneration ==
Father Ilarion Felea was proposed for canonization in 2025 when the Romanian Orthodox Church will celebrate 140 years of autocephaly and 100 years since obtaining the status of a patriarchate. He was canonized on February 4, 2025 by the Romanian Orthodox Church.
