= Dimitrie D. Stancu =

Romanian mathematician (1927–2014)

Dimitrie D Stancu
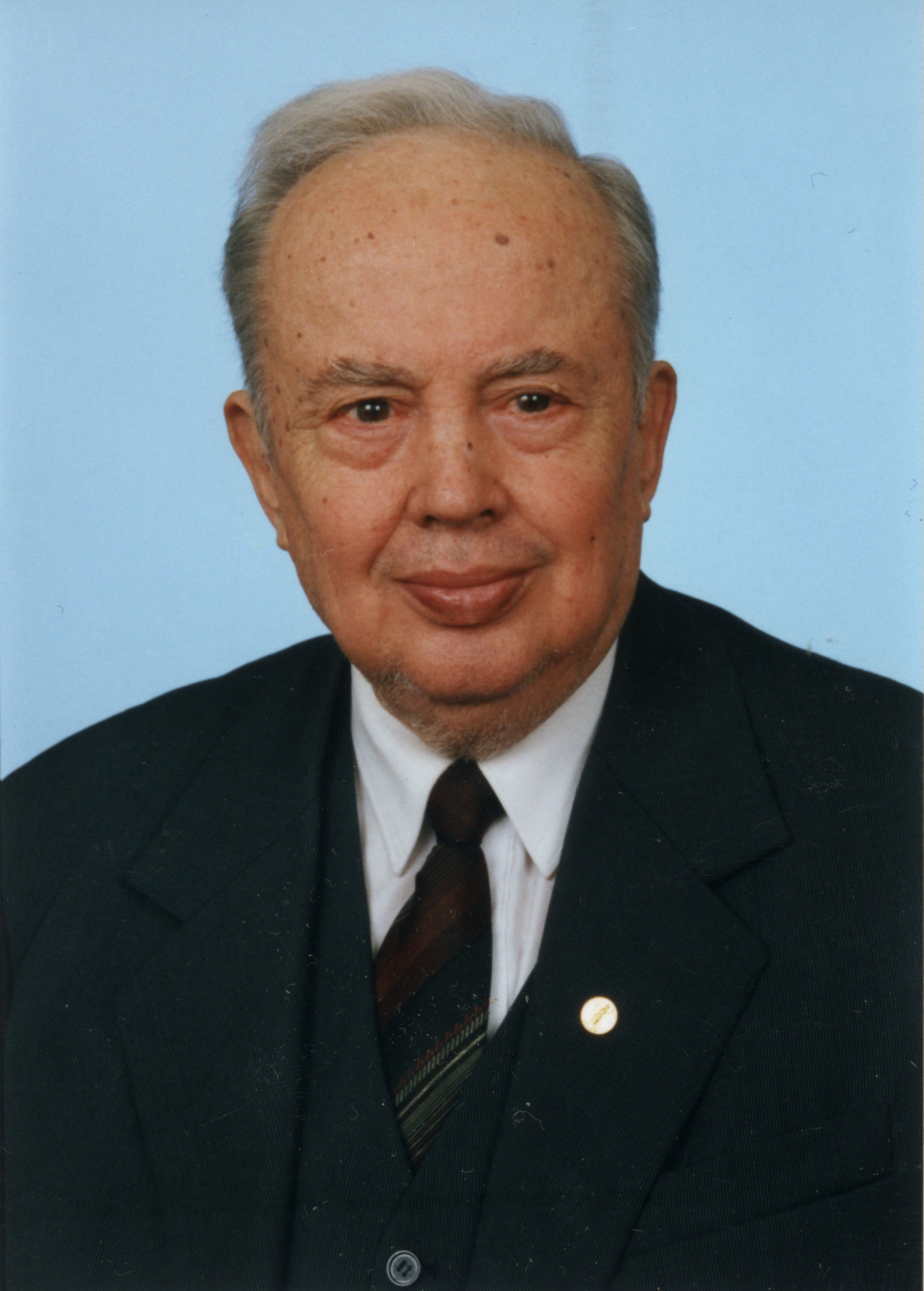
- Born: 11 February 1927; Călacea, Timiș County
- Died: 17 April 2014 (aged 87); Cluj-Napoca, Romania
- Education: Babeș-Bolyai University (PhD)
- Occupation: Mathematician
- Spouse: Felicia Stancu
- Children: 2

Dimitrie D. Stancu (11 February 1927 – 17 April 2014) was a Romanian mathematician and professor. His work primarily focused on numerical analysis and approximation theories. During his career, he served as the Member of the Scientific Council of the Institute from 1990 until 2014. He then published his works at the Babes-Bolyai University in 1977.

== Early life and education ==
Dimitrie D. Stancu was born on 11 February 1927 in Călacea, Timiș County. His father had died prior, leaving his mother to take care of him. He began to work as a shepherd. His brother, a painter who worked in Arad, took him to an orphanage in Arad in 1937 when he was 10 years old. He was then brought up by a family some time later.

Stancu moved to Cluj where he studied at Victor Babeș University in 1947 under his supervisor Tiberiu Popoviciu, and graduated in 1951. After his graduation, he was appointed to the Department of Mathematical Analysis of Babeș University. He obtained a PhD in 1956.

== Career ==
Between 1961 and 1962, he was tasked by the Romanian Ministry of Education to undertake research in the Department of Numerical Analysis at the University of Wisconsin-Madison, conducted by Preston C Hammer. When he returned to Romania, he was named full professor of the Numerical and Statistical Calculus Chair from the Faculty of Mathematics at the Babeș-Bolyai University. In 1968, he studied and introduced a new linear equation known as the "fundamental polynomials of Stancu”.

During his career, he wrote over 120 papers of research dedicated to mathematics. In 1999, he was elected an honorary member of the Romanian Academy, with the University of Sibiu and the North University of Baia Mare titling him as Doctor Honoris Causa alongside.

== Personal life ==
Stancu married mathematician Felicia. They later had two daughters, Angela Stancu (born 1957) and Mirela (born 1958), both of whom became teachers. Stancu died on 17 April 2014 in Cluj. He was 87.
