= Helen Forrester =

Anglo-Canadian author (1919–2011)

Helen Forrester was the pen name of June Huband Bhatia (6 June 1919 – 24 November 2011), who was an Anglo-Canadian author known for her books about her youth in Liverpool, England, during the Great Depression and World War II, as well as several works of fiction.

== Life and work ==
June Huband was born in Hoylake, Cheshire, Wirral Peninsula, the eldest of seven children of inept, socialite, middle-class parents who lived on credit.

When her father went bankrupt during the Great Depression, the family was thrown into poverty. Evicted from their comfortable home in an English market town and with nothing more than the clothes they stood up in, the large family took the train to Liverpool, where they hoped to rebuild their lives. While Forrester's father searched unsuccessfully for work, the family were forced to live together in a single room. As the eldest child, the 12-year-old Helen was kept away from school to look after her six younger brothers and sisters.

For the next few years the family were forced to rely on meagre handouts from the parish, and the kindness of strangers. At the age of 14 Forrester rebelled against her life of drudgery and her parents agreed to allow her to attend evening classes to make up for her missed years of education.

Throughout her teenage years, Forrester worked for a charitable organisation in Liverpool and Bootle, which provided background for her novels Liverpool Daisy, A Cuppa Tea and an Aspirin, and Three Women of Liverpool. After surviving the Liverpool Blitz and losing two consecutive fiancés to the Second World War she met and, in 1950, married physicist Dr. Avadh Bhatia (d.1984). They had one child, Robert Bhatia, who in 2017 published a biography of Helen, Passage Across the Mersey. Forrester's life with Bhatia in India provided background for Thursday's Child and The Moneylenders of Shahpur.

The couple traveled widely, eventually settling in Edmonton, Alberta, Canada, in 1955, where Dr. Bhatia became the director of the Theoretical Physics Institute at the University of Alberta. He was a pioneer in electronic transport theory and the study of diffraction of light by ultrasonic waves. The Physics Building at the University of Alberta is named after him.

The best-selling memoir of her childhood was Twopence to Cross the Mersey. It was later turned into a successful musical by Rob Fennah, Helen Jones and Alan Fennah. By The Waters of Liverpool was also adapted for the stage by the same team and first performed in 2020.

Living in Alberta provided background for Forrester's novels The Latchkey Kid and The Lemon Tree. Yes Mama, which takes place mostly in late 19th- and early 20th-century Liverpool, also includes a section about Alberta.

== Death ==
Forrester died on 24 November 2011 in Edmonton, Alberta, aged 92.

== Honours ==
Forrester was awarded honorary doctorates by the University of Liverpool in 1988 and by the University of Alberta in 1993.

A Blue Plaque was unveiled in her honour at 5 Warren Road, Hoylake, Wirral (her maternal grandmother's home where she spent happy childhood holidays) in 2020 by actors Mark Moraghan and Sian Reeves, who were performing in the stage version of By The Waters of Liverpool. Her son Robert Bhatia attended the unveiling.

== Bibliography ==
=== Autobiographical works ===
- Twopence to Cross The Mersey (1974) ISBN 0-00-636168-4
- Liverpool Miss (originally published as Minerva's Stepchild) (1979) ISBN 0-00-636494-2
- By the Waters of Liverpool (1981) ISBN 0-00-636540-X
- Lime Street at Two (1985) ISBN 0-00-637000-4

=== Fiction ===
- Liverpool Daisy (1979) ISBN 0-00-616901-5
- Three Women of Liverpool (1984) ISBN 0-00-617011-0
- The Latchkey Kid (1985) ISBN 0-00-617246-6
- Thursday's Child (1985) ISBN 0-00-617244-X
- The Moneylenders of Shahpur (1987) ISBN 0-00-617354-3
- Yes, Mama (1988) ISBN 0-00-617470-1
- The Lemon Tree (1990) ISBN 0-00-617748-4
- The Liverpool Basque (1993) ISBN 0-00-647334-2
- Mourning Doves (1996) ISBN 0-00-649874-4
- Madame Barbara (1999) ISBN 0-00-651348-4
- A Cuppa Tea and an Aspirin (2003) ISBN 0-00-715694-4
