= Popoviciu's inequality on variances =

Probability theory upper bound

In probability theory, Popoviciu's inequality, named after Tiberiu Popoviciu, is an upper bound on the variance σ^{2} of any bounded probability distribution. Let M and m be upper and lower bounds on the values of any random variable with a particular probability distribution. Then Popoviciu's inequality states:

$$\sigma^2 \le \frac14 ( M - m )^2.$$

This equality holds precisely when half of the probability is concentrated at each of the two bounds.

Sharma et al. have sharpened Popoviciu's inequality:

$${\sigma^2 + \left( \frac {\mu_3} {2\sigma^2} \right)^2} \le \frac14 (M - m)^2,$$

Where $\mu_3$ is the third central moment.

If one additionally assumes knowledge of the expectation, then the stronger Bhatia–Davis inequality holds

$$\sigma^2 \le ( M - \mu )( \mu - m )$$

where μ is the expectation of the random variable.

In the case of an independent sample of n observations from a bounded probability distribution, the von Szokefalvi Nagy inequality gives a lower bound to the variance of the sample mean:

$$\sigma^2 \ge \frac{ ( M - m )^2} {2n}.$$

== Proof via the Bhatia–Davis inequality ==
Let $A$ be a random variable with mean $\mu$, variance $\sigma^2$, and $\Pr(m \leq A \leq M) = 1$. Then, since $m \leq A \leq M$,

$0 \leq \mathbb{E}[(M - A)(A - m)] = -\mathbb{E}[A^2] - m M + (m+M)\mu$.

Thus,

$\sigma^2 = \mathbb{E}[A^2] - \mu^2 \leq - m M + (m+M)\mu - \mu^2 = (M - \mu) (\mu - m)$.

Now, applying the Inequality of arithmetic and geometric means, $ab \leq \left( \frac{a+b}{2} \right)^2$, with $a = M - \mu$ and $b = \mu - m$, yields the desired result:

$\sigma^2 \leq (M - \mu) (\mu - m) \leq \frac{\left(M - m\right)^2}{4}$.
