= Popoviciu's inequality =

Mathematical inequality about convex functions

In convex analysis, Popoviciu's inequality is an inequality about convex functions. It is similar to Jensen's inequality and was found in 1965 by Tiberiu Popoviciu, a Romanian mathematician.

== Formulation ==
Let f be a function from an interval $I \subseteq \mathbb{R}$ to $\mathbb{R}$. If f is convex, then for any three points x, y, z in I,

$$\frac{f(x)+f(y)+f(z)}{3} + f\left(\frac{x+y+z}{3}\right) \ge \frac{2}{3}\left[ f\left(\frac{x+y}{2}\right) + f\left(\frac{y+z}{2}\right) + f\left(\frac{z+x}{2}\right) \right].$$

If a function f is continuous, then it is convex if and only if the above inequality holds for all x, y, z from $I$. When f is strictly convex, the inequality is strict except for x = y = z.

== Generalizations ==
It can be generalized to any finite number n of points instead of 3, taken on the right-hand side k at a time instead of 2 at a time:

Let f be a continuous function from an interval $I \subseteq \mathbb{R}$ to $\mathbb{R}$. Then f is convex if and only if, for any integers n and k where n ≥ 3 and $2 \leq k \leq n-1$, and any n points $x_1, \dots, x_n$ from I,

$$\frac{1}{k} \binom{n-2}{k-2} \left( \frac{n-k}{k-1} \sum_{i=1}^{n}f(x_i) + nf\left(\frac1n\sum_{i=1}^{n}x_i\right) \right)\ge \sum_{1 \le i_1 < \dots < i_k \le n} f\left( \frac1k \sum_{j=1}^{k} x_{i_j} \right)$$

== Weighted inequality ==
Popoviciu's inequality can also be generalized to a weighted inequality.

Let f be a continuous function from an interval $I \subseteq \mathbb{R}$ to $\mathbb{R}$. Let $x_1, x_2, x_3$ be three points from $I$, and let $w_1, w_2, w_3$ be three nonnegative reals such that $w_2 + w_3\ne0, w_3 + w_1\ne0$ and $w_1 + w_2\ne0$. Then,

$$\begin{aligned}&w_{1} f\left(x_{1}\right)+w_{2} f\left(x_{2}\right)+w_{3} f\left(x_{3}\right)+\left(w_{1}+w_{2}+w_{3}\right) f\left(\frac{w_{1} x_{1}+w_{2} x_{2}+w_{3} x_{3}}{w_{1}+w_{2}+w_{3}}\right)\\&\geq\left(w_{2}+w_{3}\right) f\left(\frac{w_{2} x_{2}+w_{3} x_{3}}{w_{2}+w_{3}}\right)+\left(w_{3}+w_{1}\right) f\left(\frac{w_{3} x_{3}+w_{1} x_{1}}{w_{3}+w_{1}}\right)+\left(w_{1}+w_{2}\right) f\left(\frac{w_{1} x_{1}+w_{2} x_{2}}{w_{1}+w_{2}}\right)\end{aligned}$$
