= Alison Criscitiello =

American ice core scientist (born 1981)

Alison Sara Criscitiello
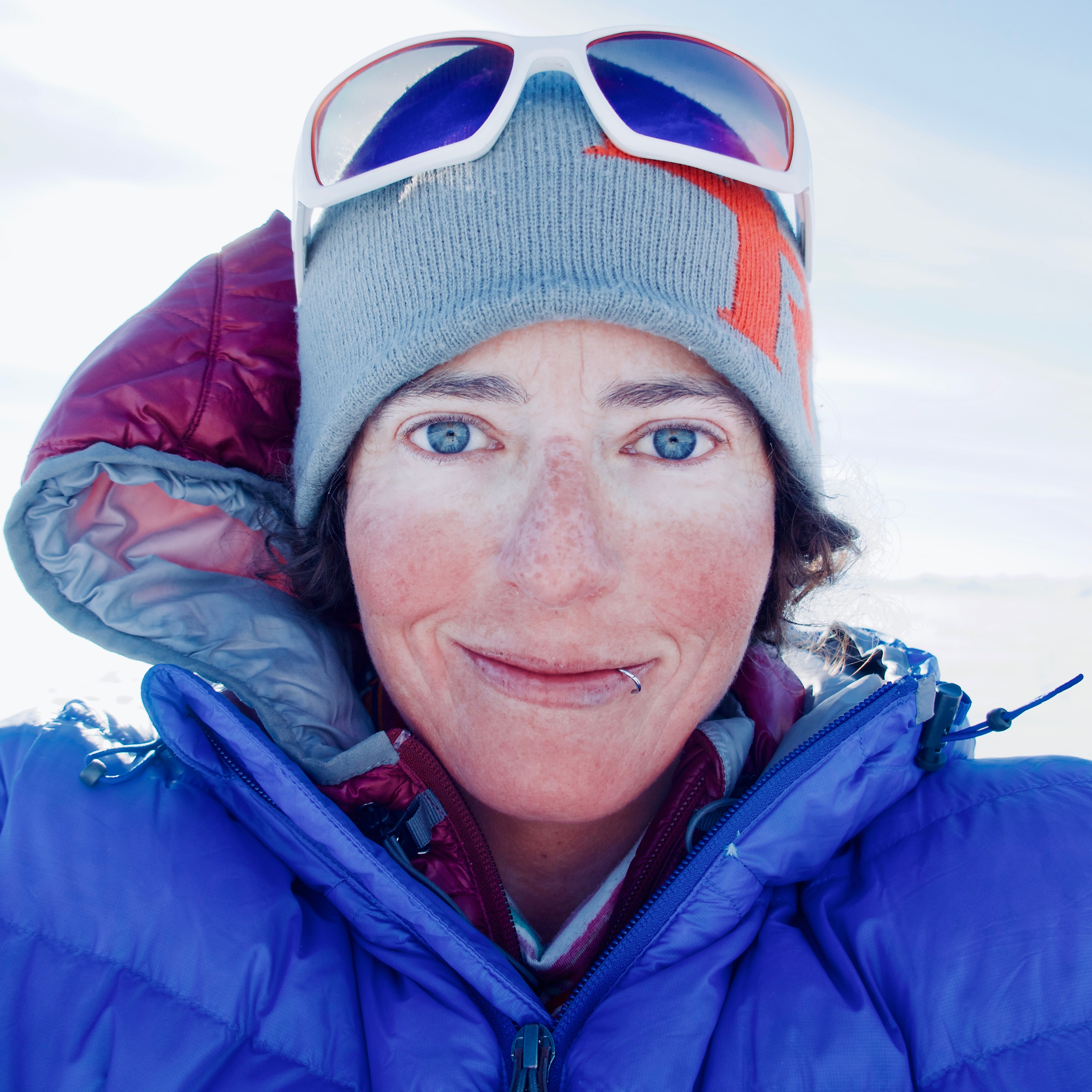
- Alison Criscitiello drilling ice cores on Mount Oxford, Ellesmere Island, Nunavut.
- Born: May 20, 1981 (age 45); Pittsburgh, PA
- Education: Wesleyan University (BA); Columbia University (MA); MIT-WHOI (PhD)
- Scientific career
- Fields: Glaciology
- Workplaces: University of Calgary, University of Alberta
- Thesis: Amundsen Sea sea-ice variability, atmospheric circulation, and spatial variations in snow isotopic composition from new West Antarctic firn cores (2014)
- Doctoral advisor: Sarah Das

Alison Criscitiello is an American ice core scientist, National Geographic explorer, Fellow of the Royal Canadian Geographical Society, and Director of the Canadian Ice Core Lab at the University of Alberta. In addition to her academic work, she is a co-founder of Girls on Ice Canada and an avid adventurer and mountain climber. She led the first all-women ascent of Lingsarmo (formerly known as Pinnacle Peak) and has received numerous American Alpine Club grants for her pioneering expeditions.

== Early life and education ==
Criscitiello grew up in Winchester, Massachusetts, and is a former U.S. Climbing Ranger (Olympic and North Cascades National Parks). She has two sisters, one of whom is her identical twin. She received a BA in Earth and Environmental Science from Wesleyan University in 2003, an MA in Geology and Geophysics from Columbia University in 2006, and a PhD in Glaciology from the Massachusetts Institute of Technology and Woods Hole Oceanographic Institution (MIT-WHOI) in 2014. Hers was the first PhD in Glaciology conferred by MIT-WHOI.

== Career ==
After completing her Ph.D., Criscitiello accepted a Post-Doctoral Fellowship in the Department of Geography at the University of Calgary, and has been an adjunct assistant professor there since 2016. She became the Director of the Ice Core Laboratory at the University of Alberta in 2017. Using ice cores from the polar regions, her research helps explain how ocean conditions impact coastal ice caps and ice sheets, and how global atmospheric teleconnections drive such variability at the poles. Newer projects involving drilling ice cores in non-polar regions contribute to a deeper understanding of climate variability as well as human impacts on remote landscapes.

Criscitiello is the Canadian national delegate to the International Partnerships in Ice Core Science, and is a member of their Steering Committee.

She is a co-founder of Girls on Ice Canada.

=== Selected expeditions ===
- 2021 Mount Logan
- 2017 Dawson to Tuktayaktuk Arctic Bike
- 2016 Borderski
- 2010 Lingsarmo

== Awards and recognition ==
- 2026 David R. Brower Conservation Award, American Alpine Club
- 2025 Explorers Club 50 (EC50)
- 2020 National Geographic Explorer
- 2018 Best Mountaineering Article Award (Banff Mountain Book Competition)
- 2017 American Alpine Club Research Grant recipient
- 2016 Mugs Stump Award
- 2015 John Lauchlan Award
- 2015 Lara-Karena Bitenieks Kellogg and Scott Fischer Memorial Conservation Grant

== Selected works ==
- Criscitiello, A. S.; Geldsetzer, T.; Rhodes, R. H.; Arienzo, M.; McConnell, J.; Chellman, N.; Osman, M. B.; Yackel, J. J.; Marshall, S. (2021). "Marine Aerosol Records of Arctic Sea-Ice and Polynya Variability From New Ellesmere and Devon Island Firn Cores, Nunavut, Canada". Journal of Geophysical Research: Oceans. 126 (9) e2021JC017205. Bibcode:2021JGRC..12617205C. doi:10.1029/2021JC017205. ISSN 2169-9275.
- Pickard, Heidi M.; Criscitiello, Alison S.; Persaud, Daniel; Spencer, Christine; Muir, Derek C. G.; Lehnherr, Igor; Sharp, Martin J.; De Silva, Amila O.; Young, Cora J. (2020-05-28). "Ice Core Record of Persistent Short-Chain Fluorinated Alkyl Acids: Evidence of the Impact From Global Environmental Regulations". Geophysical Research Letters. 47 (10) e2020GL087535. Bibcode:2020GeoRL..4787535P. doi:10.1029/2020GL087535. ISSN 0094-8276. S2CID 218992460.
- Pickard, Heidi M.; Criscitiello, Alison S.; Spencer, Christine; Sharp, Martin J.; Muir, Derek C. G.; De Silva, Amila O.; Young, Cora J. (2018-04-13). "Continuous non-marine inputs of per- and polyfluoroalkyl substances to the High Arctic: a multi-decadal temporal record". Atmospheric Chemistry and Physics. 18 (7): 5045–5058. Bibcode:2018ACP....18.5045P. doi:10.5194/acp-18-5045-2018. ISSN 1680-7316.
- Criscitiello, Alison S.; Marshall, Shawn J.; Evans, Matthew J.; Kinnard, Christophe; Norman, Ann-Lise; Sharp, Martin J. (2016-08-27). "Marine aerosol source regions to Prince of Wales Icefield, Ellesmere Island, and influence from the tropical Pacific, 1979–2001". Journal of Geophysical Research: Atmospheres. 121 (16): 9492–9507. Bibcode:2016JGRD..121.9492C. doi:10.1002/2015JD024457. ISSN 2169-897X. S2CID 132397081.
- Criscitiello, Alison S.; Das, Sarah B.; Karnauskas, Kristopher B.; Evans, Matthew J.; Frey, Karen E.; Joughin, Ian; Steig, Eric J.; McConnell, Joseph R.; Medley, Brooke (2014-02-01). "Tropical Pacific Influence on the Source and Transport of Marine Aerosols to West Antarctica". Journal of Climate. 27 (3): 1343–1363. Bibcode:2014JCli...27.1343C. doi:10.1175/JCLI-D-13-00148.1. hdl:1721.1/90294. ISSN 0894-8755. S2CID 11847367.
- Criscitiello, Alison S.; Das, Sarah B.; Evans, Matthew J.; Frey, Karen E.; Conway, Howard; Joughin, Ian; Medley, Brooke; Steig, Eric J. (2013). "Ice sheet record of recent sea-ice behavior and polynya variability in the Amundsen Sea, West Antarctica: ICE SHEET RECORD OF SEA-ICE VARIABILITY". Journal of Geophysical Research: Oceans. 118 (1): 118–130. doi:10.1029/2012JC008077. hdl:1912/5920.
