= Maya Bhatia =

Biogeochemist and Arctic science researcher

- Education: University of Alberta; MIT
- Scientific career
- Fields: Biogeochemistry; Microbial ecology Arctic science
- Workplaces: University of Alberta

Maya Bhatia was a Canadian biogeochemist known for her research in the Arctic, focusing on microbial ecology and biogeochemistry. Bhatia died during field work near Grise Fiord in 2023.

== Early life and education ==
Bhatia was an alumna of the University of Alberta, where she received her bachelor's and master's degrees, contributing early to her field under the supervision of Martin Sharp and Julia Foght in the Departments of Earth and Atmospheric Sciences and Biological Sciences. She furthered her education in the MIT-WHOI Joint Program, graduating in February 2012 with a PhD, co-advised by Elizabeth Kujawinski and Sarah Das in the MG&G Department.

== Career and research ==
As an associate professor at the University of Alberta and a CAIP Chair in Watershed Science, Bhatia's research spanned glaciers, ice sheets, and oceans. Her work focused on understanding the interactions between microbes and their environment, particularly in relation to carbon cycling and nutrient production, with implications for global climate change. In 2022, Dr. Maya Bhatia received the CNC/SCOR Early Career Ocean Scientist Award for her contributions to oceanography and biogeochemistry research in northern Canada, focusing on the impacts of climate change on the ocean and nutrient contributions from glaciers.

== Death ==
Bhatia died while conducting field work in the High Arctic near Aujuittuq (Grise Fiord), Nunavut, on 16 August 2023. She was swept away after slipping and falling while collecting water from a supraglacial stream. Her student and the helicopter pilot were with her at the time but unable to reach her due to fast moving water.
