= John Benedetto =

American mathematician (born 1939)

John J. Benedetto
- Born: July 16, 1939 (age 87); Boston, Massachusetts
- Education: University of Toronto
- Known for: Harmonic analysis, wavelet analysis, frame theory
- Scientific career
- Fields: Mathematics
- Workplaces: University of Maryland
- Doctoral advisor: Chandler Davis

John Joseph Benedetto (born July 16, 1939) is a professor of Mathematics at the University of Maryland, College Park and is a leading researcher in wavelet analysis and Director of the Norbert Wiener Center for Harmonic Analysis and Applications. He was named Distinguished Scholar-Teacher by the University of Maryland in 1999 and has directed 63 Ph.D. students. The volume Harmonic Analysis and Applications: In Honor of John Benedetto, edited by Christopher Heil, describes his influence:

John J. Benedetto has had a profound influence not only on the direction of harmonic analysis and its applications, but also on the entire community of people involved in the field.

He was a Senior Fulbright-Hays Scholar (1973–1974), and was awarded the 2011 SPIE Wavelet Pioneer award. He is also a Fellow of the American Mathematical Society and a SIAM Fellow.

== Education ==
Benedetto attended Boston College, graduating in 1960 with a B.A. in mathematics. He received an M.A. from Harvard University in 1962, and a Ph.D. from the University of Toronto in 1964. He was the first student to receive a Ph.D. from then 37-year-old Chandler Davis. His dissertation was The Laplace Transform of Generalized Functions.

Garrett Birkhoff was the thesis advisor of Chandler Davis, and Birkhoff did not have a Ph.D. but was a member of the Society of Fellows at Harvard.

== Publications ==
Benedetto is founding Editor-in-Chief of the Journal of Fourier Analysis and Applications, founded in 1994 and published by Springer-Birkhäuser. He is also founding and current editor of the Springer-Birkhäuser Applied and Numerical Harmonic Analysis book series. He has edited or authored 18 books and published over 185 research papers. Some of his books are the following.

=== Books ===
- (1971) Harmonic Analysis on Totally Disconnected Sets, Springer Lecture Notes 202
- (1975) Spectral Synthesis, Academic Press
- (1976) Real Variable and Integration with Historical Notes, Teubner Publishers
- (1977) A Mathematical Approach to Mathematics Appreciation, UMD
- (1979) Euclidean Harmonic Analysis, editor, Springer Lecture Notes 779
- (1994) Wavelets: Mathematics and Applications, co-edited with M. Frazier, CRC Press
- (1997) Harmonic Analysis and Applications, CRC Press
- (2001) Modern Sampling Theory: Mathematics and Applications, co-edited with P. Ferreira
- (2004) Sampling, Wavelets, and Tomography, co-edited with A. Zayed
- (2009) Integration and Modern Analysis, co-authored with Wojciech Czaja
