= Bhatti (disambiguation) =

Bhatti is a clan in India and Pakistan

Bhatti may refer to:

== History ==
- Bhatti (Buddhism), a type of devotion
- Bhaṭṭi, a 7th-century Sanskrit poet

== People with the name ==
- Bhatti (surname)

== See also ==
- Bhati (disambiguation)
- Bhutto (disambiguation)
- Bhutta (disambiguation)
- Bhatia (disambiguation)
- Bhattian (disambiguation)
- Bhat, an Indian surname
