= Bhati, Maharashtra =

Village in Maharashtra

Bhati
- Village
- Interactive map of Bhati
- Country: India
- State: Maharashtra

Bhati is a small village in Ratnagiri district, Maharashtra state in Western India. The 2011 Census of India recorded a total of 893 residents in the village. Bhati's geographical area is approximately 36 hectares (89 acres).
