= Sarah Das =

American glaciologist

- Scientific career
- Doctoral students: Alison Criscitiello

Sarah Das is an American glaciologist and climate scientist. She works at the Woods Hole Oceanographic Institute in Woods Hole, Massachusetts and is a member of Science Moms, a group of scientist mothers working to make climate science accessible and to motivate parents to demand climate change plans and solutions for their children's future.

== Education ==
Das holds a Ph.D. in Geosciences from Pennsylvania State University and a Bachelor of Arts in Geological Sciences from Cornell University.

== Scholarship ==
Das' research interests are in glaciology and paleoclimatology, and teaching interests are in polar science, climate change, and experiential outdoor science education.

Her scholarly contributions have been featured in journals such as Nature, and circulated in news media such as CNN, USA Today, Forbes, National Geographic, and The Guardian. She also has been leading scientific expeditions to the polar ice sheets for over 25 years. She is a principal investigator at the Disko Bay Ice Coring Project.

Her research with the Woodwell Climate Research Center was presented at the Conference of Parties or COP26 titled "Refreeze the Arctic: Increasing our Ambition to Maintain a Safe and Stable Climate."

She has studied Greenland ice cores to study climate history, and she has documented increasing melt rates.

Das has served on the U.S. National Academies Polar Research Board.

== Works ==
- Osman, Matthew B.; Smith, Benjamin E.; Trusel, Luke D.; Das, Sarah B.; McConnell, Joseph R.; Chellman, Nathan; Arienzo, Monica; Sodemann, Harald (October 2021). "Abrupt Common Era hydroclimate shifts drive west Greenland ice cap change". Nature Geoscience. 14 (10): 756–761. doi:10.1038/s41561-021-00818-w. ISSN 1752-0908. S2CID 237458862.
- Osman, Matthew B.; Das, Sarah B.; Trusel, Luke D.; Evans, Matthew J.; Fischer, Hubertus; Grieman, Mackenzie M.; Kipfstuhl, Sepp; McConnell, Joseph R.; Saltzman, Eric S. (May 2019). "Industrial-era decline in subarctic Atlantic productivity". Nature. 569 (7757): 551–555. doi:10.1038/s41586-019-1181-8. ISSN 1476-4687. PMID 31061499. S2CID 146118196.
- Wagner, Till J. W.; Straneo, Fiamma; Richards, Clark G.; Slater, Donald A.; Stevens, Laura A.; Das, Sarah B.; Singh, Hanumant (2018-07-24). "Large spatial variations in the frontal mass budget of a Greenland tidewater glacier". doi:10.5194/tc-2018-143. hdl:1912/24086. S2CID 53600930.
- Trusel, Luke D.; Das, Sarah B.; Osman, Matthew B.; Evans, Matthew J.; Smith, Ben E.; Fettweis, Xavier; McConnell, Joseph R.; Noël, Brice P. Y.; van den Broeke, Michiel R. (December 2018). "Nonlinear rise in Greenland runoff in response to post-industrial Arctic warming". Nature. 564 (7734): 104–108. doi:10.1038/s41586-018-0752-4. hdl:1874/374413. ISSN 1476-4687. PMID 30518887. S2CID 54458850.
