= Surita Bhatia =

American chemist

Surita Rani Bhatia
- Education: University of Delaware; Princeton University
- Scientific career
- Workplaces: University of Massachusetts Amherst; Stony Brook University
- Thesis: Structure and rheology of associative triblocks in microemulsion solutions (2000)
- Website: Bhatia Research Group

Surita Bhatia is an American chemical engineer, chemist, and materials scientist who is professor and Associate Dean for Faculty Affairs and Innovation, Diversity, Equity, and Access in the College of Arts and Sciences at Stony Brook University. Her work considers the structure of soft materials, including polymeric hydrogels and colloidal glasses. She was elected Fellow of the American Institute of Chemical Engineers, the American Institute for Medical and Biological Engineering and the Society of Rheology in 2020.

== Early life and education ==
Bhatia was an undergraduate studied at the University of Delaware. She majored in chemical engineering, and graduated in 1995. She moved to Princeton University for her graduate studies, where she worked with William B. Russel on the rheology of associative polymers. Bhatia completed her doctoral studies in 2000, and moved to the French National Centre for Scientific Research (CNRS) Complex Fluids Laboratory as a postdoctoral researcher.

== Research and career ==
Bhatia joined the faculty at the University of Massachusetts Amherst in 2001, where she was awarded an National Science Foundation CAREER Award to study soft attractive gels.

At UMass, Bhatia developed engineering education programme that taught about equity, diversity and the societal impacts of engineering. Her teaching materials were selected by the National Academy of Engineering as an example of best practise in education. She has led programs to support underrepresented students in the biomedical sciences.

In 2012, Bhatia joined the department of chemistry at Stony Brook University, where she was promoted to professor in 2015. She holds a joint role as a staff scientist at the Center for Functional Nanomaterials at the Brookhaven National Laboratory.

Bhatia has worked to elucidate structure-properties relationships of complex fluids using ultra small-angle X-ray scattering and ultra small-angle neutron scattering. She combines these techniques with rheology to establish the molecular mechanisms that underpin dynamically arrested states and re-entrant behavior in colloidal systems.

== Awards and honors ==
- 2012 AIChE Women in Chemical Engineering Mentorship Excellence Award
- 2018 AIChE Award for Outstanding Contributions to Chemical Engineering
- 2020 Elected Fellow of the American Institute of Chemical Engineers
- 2020 Elected Fellow of the American Institute for Medical and Biological Engineering
- 2020 Elected Fellow of Society of Rheology

== Selected publications ==
- Akhilesh Banerjee; Manish Arha; Soumitra Choudhary; Randolph S Ashton; Surita R Bhatia; David V Schaffer; Ravi S Kane (17 June 2009). "The influence of hydrogel modulus on the proliferation and differentiation of encapsulated neural stem cells". Biomaterials. 30 (27): 4695–4699. doi:10.1016/j.biomaterials.2009.05.050. ISSN 0142-9612. PMC 2743317. PMID 19539367. Wikidata Q37345194.
- Khaled A. Aamer; Heidi Sardinha; Surita R. Bhatia; Gregory N. Tew (1 March 2004). "Rheological studies of PLLA-PEO-PLLA triblock copolymer hydrogels". Biomaterials. 25 (6): 1087–1093. doi:10.1016/s0142-9612(03)00632-x. ISSN 0142-9612. PMID 14615174. Wikidata Q44654206.
- Sarwat F Khattak; Surita R Bhatia; Susan C Roberts (1 May 2005). "Pluronic F127 as a cell encapsulation material: utilization of membrane-stabilizing agents". Tissue Engineering. 11 (5–6): 974–983. doi:10.1089/ten.2005.11.974. ISSN 1076-3279. PMID 15998236. Wikidata Q40401743.
