= Bhattian (Ludhiana West) =

- Neighborhood of Ludhiana
- Location in Punjab, India Bhattian (India)
- Coordinates: 30.9581641°N 75.8213787°E
- Country: India
- State: Punjab
- District: Ludhiana
- City: Ludhiana

Government
  - Body: Ludhiana Municipal Corporation

Languages
  - Official: Punjabi
  - Other spoken: Hindi
- Time zone: UTC+5:30 (IST)
- Telephone code: 0161
- ISO 3166 code: IN-PB
- Vehicle registration: PB-10
- Website: ludhiana.nic.in

Bhattian is a neighborhood located in the western part of Ludhiana, a city in the Indian Punjab. This neighborhood was previously a village which has now been incorporated into the expansion of Ludhiana city.

== Administration ==
Bhattian falls under the jurisdiction of the Ludhiana Municipal Corporation. The area is part of the Ludhiana district and is represented in the Lok Sabha constituency of Ludhiana.

| Particulars | Total | Male | Female |
|---|---|---|---|
| Total No. of Houses | 245 | | |
| Population | 1,234 | 640 | 594 |
| Child (0–6) | 116 | 59 | 57 |
| Schedule Caste | 226 | 117 | 109 |
| Schedule Tribe | 0 | 0 | 0 |
| Literacy | 84.97 % | 86.06 % | 83.80 |
| Total Workers | 427 | 375 | 52 |
| Main Worker | 408 | 0 | 0 |
| Marginal Worker | 19 | 15 | 4 |

== Caste ==
The locality comprises 40% of residents from the General Category (primarily Jatt clans such as Sandhu, Sidhu, and Garewal) and 18.31% from the Scheduled Castes. There is no recorded Scheduled Tribe population in the locality.

== Air travel connectivity ==
The nearest airport to Bhattian area in Ludhiana is Sahnewal Airport.
