= Balwinder Kaur Bhatia =

Indian field hockey player

Personal information
- Nationality: Indian
- Born: 19 December 1958 (age 67)

Sport
- Sport: Field hockey

Balwinder Kaur Bhatia (born 19 December 1958) is an Indian field hockey player. She competed in the women's tournament at the 1980 Summer Olympics.
