= Sohan Lal Bhatia =

Indian army medical officer

Major-General Sohan Lal Bhatia CIE MC FASc FRSE FRCP
- Born: 5 August 1891; Amritsar, Punjab Province, British India (now in Punjab, India)
- Died: 16 July 1981 (aged 89); India
- Military career
- Allegiance: British India; India
- Branch: British Indian Army; Indian Army
- Service years: 1917–1950
- Rank: Major-General
- Unit: 105th Mahratta Light Infantry
- Conflicts: World War I: Battle of Megiddo; World War II; Indo-Pakistan War of 1947

Sohan Lal Bhatia (5 August 1891 – 16 July 1981) was an Indian physiologist, medical administrator and decorated Indian Army officer.

== Biography ==
Bhatia was the eldest son of Rai Bahadur Hira Lal Bhatia, an eminent surgeon practising in Lahore. Educated in Lahore at the Central Model School, Lahore, and the Government College Lahore, he began his medical studies at Peterhouse, Cambridge in 1910. He subsequently pursued his clinical studies at St Thomas' Hospital, London. On the outbreak of war in 1914, Bhatia volunteered as a surgical dresser on HMHS Guildford Castle. He completed his degree in 1917, and following graduation was appointed a temporary lieutenant in the Indian Medical Service (IMS), effective from 8 April 1917. In May 1918 he was attached to the 105th Mahratta Light Infantry (now the Maratha Light Infantry, then part of the Egyptian Expeditionary Force). In September 1918, he was awarded the Military Cross (MC) for courage under fire during the Battle of Megiddo; the award was gazetted in April 1919:

Near Sabieh, on the 19th September 1918, for conspicuous gallantry under intense fire. The enemy put down a heavy barrage where he had established his aid post. In the midst of this he carried out his work with an absolute disregard of his personal safety. The skilful way the wounded were dressed by him, in spite of the adverse conditions, afterwards elicitated (sic) the admiration of the medical officers in the dressing stations.

Bhatia was the sole IMS recipient of the Military Cross in 1918. After the war, he received a regular commission in the IMS, with effect from 15 March 1920. He was promoted to substantive captain on 8 April 1920, with seniority from the same date. The same year, he was appointed professor of physiology and hygiene at Grant Medical College in Bombay, becoming its first Indian dean in 1925. He was promoted to major on 8 April 1928, with promotion to lieutenant-colonel on 8 October 1936. On 27 October 1937, Bhatia was appointed principal of the Grant Medical College and superintendent of the Jamsetji Jeejeebhoy Hospital Group.

During the Second World War, Bhatia was appointed an additional deputy director-general of the IMS on 19 August 1941, serving in this capacity for most of the war. On 1 June 1945, he was appointed inspector-general of civil hospitals and prisons in Assam Province, receiving promotion to colonel on 11 June (seniority from 8 October 1939). He was appointed a Companion of the Order of the Indian Empire (CIE) in the 1946 New Year Honours list.
