= Suresh Kumar Bhatia =

Indian-born Australian chemical engineer

- Born: 8 September 1952 (age 73); India
- Citizenship: Australia
- Education: IIT Kanpur; University of Pennsylvania
- Known for: Engineering analysis of reaction and transport processes in porous media
- Awards: 1993 Shanti Swarup Bhatnagar Prize; 2009 IChE ExxonMobil Award
- Scientific career
- Fields: Porous media; Mathematical modeling
- Workplaces: University of Florida; IIT Mumbai; University of Queensland

Suresh Kumar Bhatia (born 1952) is an Indian-born chemical engineer and professor emeritus at the School of Chemical Engineering, University of Queensland. He is known for his studies on porous media and catalytic and non-catalytic solid fluid reactions. He was awarded an ARC Australian Professorial Fellowship (2010–15) and is an elected fellow of the Indian Academy of Sciences (1993), and the Australian Academy of Technological Sciences and Engineering (2010). In 1993, the Council of Scientific and Industrial Research, the Indian government's peak agency for scientific research, awarded him the Shanti Swarup Bhatnagar Prize for Science and Technology, one of the highest Indian science awards, for his contributions to the engineering sciences.

== Biography ==
Born on 8 September 1952, Bhatia graduated in chemical engineering (BTech) from the Indian Institute of Technology, Kanpur and gained his master's and doctoral degrees at the University of Pennsylvania. Starting his career in the US in the chemical industry, he shifted to university research by joining the University of Florida, where he worked for two years until his move to the Indian Institute of Technology, Mumbai in 1984. He served IIT Mumbai for 12 years, winning the Herdillia Award for Excellence in Basic Research in Chemical Engineering, Indian Institute of Chemical Engineers in 1992. He joined the School of Chemical Engineering at the University of Queensland in 1996, where he is currently an emeritus professor.

Focusing his work on transport and reaction in nanostructured porous media, Bhatia has contributed to the field of catalysis, specifically in vapour-liquid and reaction equilibria in small pores. He elucidated multiphase reactions in catalyst particles by demonstrating the existence and consequence of partial internal wetting states.

He was elected a fellow of the Institution of Chemical Engineers, Australia. He received the ExxonMobil Award for excellence of the Institution of Chemical Engineers in 2009, and the Institution of Chemical Engineers, UK (2008). He served on the ARC's Excellence in Research Australia Panel in 2012, and received the University of Queensland, Vice-Chancellor's Research Excellence Award (2011).

== Selected bibliography ==
- Farmahini, A.H. D.S. Sholl and S.K. Bhatia (2015). "Fluorinated carbide-derived carbon: more hydrophilic, yet apparently more hydrophobic". J Am Chem Soc. 137 (18): 5969–79. doi:10.1021/jacs.5b01105. PMID 25909685.
- Bhatia, S.K., M.R. Bonilla and D. Nicholson (2011). "Molecular transport in nanopores: a theoretical perspective". Phys Chem Chem Phys. 13 (34): 15350–83. Bibcode:2011PCCP...1315350B. doi:10.1039/c1cp21166h. PMID 21750793.
- Nguyen, T.X., H. Jobic and S.K. Bhatia (2010). "Microscopic observation of kinetic molecular sieving of hydrogen isotopes in a nanoporous material" (PDF). Phys Rev Lett. 105 (8) 085901. Bibcode:2010PhRvL.105h5901N. doi:10.1103/PhysRevLett.105.085901. PMID 20868113.
- Bhatia, S.K., and D. Nicholson (2008). "Modeling mixture transport in nanopores: departure from existing paradigms" (PDF). Phys Rev Lett. 100 (23) 236103. doi:10.1103/PhysRevLett.100.236103. PMID 18643520.
- Bhatia, S.K. and A.L Myers (2006). "Optimum conditions for adsorptive storage". Langmuir. 22 (4): 1688–1700. doi:10.1021/la0523816. PMID 16460092. S2CID 13280752.
- Anil Kumar, A.V. and S.K. Bhatia (2005). "Quantum effect induced reverse kinetic molecular sieving in microporous materials" (PDF). Phys Rev Lett. 95 (24) 245901. Bibcode:2005PhRvL..95x5901K. doi:10.1103/PhysRevLett.95.245901. PMID 16384395.
- Jepps, O., S.K. Bhatia and D. Searles (2003). "Wall mediated transport in confined spaces: exact theory for low density" (PDF). Phys Rev Lett. 91 (12) 126102. Bibcode:2003PhRvL..91l6102J. doi:10.1103/PhysRevLett.91.126102. PMID 14525376.
- Bhatia, S.K., and D. Nicholson (2003). "Hydrodynamic origin of diffusion in nanopores" (PDF). Phys Rev Lett. 90 (1) 016105. Bibcode:2003PhRvL..90a6105B. doi:10.1103/PhysRevLett.90.016105. PMID 12570631.
- Bhatia, S.K. (2002). "Density functional theory analysis of the influence of pore wall heterogeneity on adsorption in carbons". Langmuir. 18 (18): 6845–56. doi:10.1021/la0201927.
- Bhatia, S.K. and D.D. Perlmutter (1980). "A random pore model for fluid-solid reactions I: isothermal kinetic control". AIChE J. 26 (3): 379–86. Bibcode:1980AIChE..26..379B. doi:10.1002/aic.690260308.

== See also ==
- Porosity
- Nanoporous materials
