= Bhut, Nawanshahr =

Bhut
- Village
- Location in Punjab, India Bhut (India)
- Coordinates: 31.1786822°N 76.0172042°E
- Country: India
- State: Punjab
- District: Shaheed Bhagat Singh Nagar

Government
  - Type: Panchayat raj
  - Body: Gram panchayat
- Elevation: 254 m (833 ft)

Population (2011)
  - Total: 1,523
- Sex ratio 774/749 ♂/♀

Languages
  - Official: Punjabi
- Time zone: UTC+5:30 (IST)
- PIN: 144512
- Telephone code: 01884
- ISO 3166 code: IN-PB
- Post office: Kahma
- Website: nawanshahr.nic.in

Bhut or Bhoot is a village in Shaheed Bhagat Singh Nagar district of Punjab State, India. It is located 1.6 kilometres (0.99 mi) away from the postal head office at Kahma, 5.3 kilometres (3.3 mi) from Banga, 11 kilometres (6.8 mi) from district headquarters Shaheed Bhagat Singh Nagar and 101 kilometres (63 mi) from the state capital of Chandigarh. The village is administrated by a Sarpanch, an elected representative of the village.

== Demography ==
As of 2011, Bhut has a total number of 321 houses and population of 1523, of which 774 include are males while 749 are females according to the report published by Census India in 2011. The literacy rate of Bhut is 80.03%, higher than the state average of 75.84%. The population of children under the age of 6 years is 146, which is 9.59% of total population of Bhut, and the child sex ratio is approximately 802 as compared to the Punjab state average of 846.

Most of the people are from Schedule Caste which constitutes 51.94% of the total population in Bhut. The town does not have any Schedule Tribe population so far.

As per the report published by Census India in 2011, 493 people were engaged in work activities out of the total population of Bhut which includes 415 males and 78 females. 76.88% of workers describe their work as main work and 23.12% workers are involved in marginal activity providing livelihood for less than 6 months.

== Education ==
The village has a Punjabi medium, co-ed primary school founded in 1953. The schools provide mid-day meal as per Indian Midday Meal Scheme. The school provide free education to children between the ages of 6 and 14 as per the Right of Children to Free and Compulsory Education Act.

Amardeep Singh Shergill Memorial college Mukandpur and Sikh National College Banga are the nearest colleges. Lovely Professional University is 36.5 kilometres (22.7 mi) away from the village.

== Transport ==
Banga railway station is the nearest train station; however, Garhshankar Junction railway station is 14 kilometres (8.7 mi) away from the village. Sahnewal Airport is the nearest domestic airport, which is located 66 kilometres (41 mi) away in Ludhiana and the nearest international airport is located in Chandigarh. Sri Guru Ram Dass Jee International Airport is the second nearest airport which is 145 kilometres (90 mi) away in Amritsar.

== See also ==
- List of villages in India
