= Bir Bhan Bhatia =

Indian physician (1900–1962)

- Born: 30 August 1900; Abbottabad, British India
- Died: 13 May 1962 (aged 61); Lucknow, Uttar Pradesh, India
- Occupation: Physician
- Spouses: Shanti Devi; Norah
- Children: Four sons
- Parent(s): Abagat Hari Chand Bhatia; Jai Devi
- Awards: Padma Shri (1954)

Bir Bhan Bhatia was an Indian physician and a former member of the Legislative Council of the United Provinces in the British India. The Government of India honoured him in 1954, with the award of Padma Shri, the fourth highest Indian civilian award for his contributions to medicine, placing him among the first recipients of the award.

== Biography ==
Bir Bhan Bhatia was born in Abbottabad, formerly a part of British India, presently in Pakistan, on 30 August 1900 to Jai Devi and Abagat Hari Chand Bhatia, a government servant. He did his early college studies at Sri Pratap College, Sri Nagar from where he passed out in 1919 to join King George Medical College, Lucknow and passed bachelor's degree in medicine (MBBS) in 1924. He secured his master's degree (MD) in 1926 from there itself and worked as a demonstrator before moving to London to work as a clinical assistant at the National Heart Hospital, simultaneously pursuing his MRCP studies.

Bhatia returned to India in 1928 after obtaining the membership of the Royal College of Physicians of London (MRCP) and took up the post of a lecturer in pharmacology at his alma mater where he became a consulting physician, reader and director of the department of pharmacology in 1936. He continued his service there to become the dean and the principal in 1946, was promoted as the professor of medicine in 1947 and held the post till his retirement in 1960.

A fellow of the Royal College of Surgeons of London, Bhatia served the Legislative Council of the Union Provinces of the erstwhile British India for two terms. He was a member of the Central Committee of the Medical Council of India and played a part in the formation of the first National formulary of India. He was a member of such scientific associations as India Medical Association, the Cardiological and Neurological Societies, and the Pharmacy Council of the United Provinces and served as the president of the Association of Physicians, India. The Government of India selected him for the civilian award of Padma Shri, when the Padma awards were instituted in 1954.

Bhatia was cited in the 1958 Annual report of the Rockefeller Foundation. During the latter part of his life, he lived in his Lucknow House designed by renowned architect Walter Burley Griffin till his death on 13 May 1962. His first marriage, in 1925, was to Shanti Devi with whom he has four sons, the subsequent marriage to Norah Coady remained issueless.

== See also ==
- Walter Burley Griffin
