= Kot Bhutta =

کوٹ بھٹہ non
- Village
- Kot Bhutta
- Nickname: non
- Location in Pakistan
- Coordinates: 32°9′N 74°11′E
- Country: Pakistan
- Region: Punjab
- District: Gujranwala District
- Time zone: UTC+5 (PST)
  - Summer (DST): UTC+6 (PDT)
- Area code: 055

Kot Bhutta, (Urdu: {کوٹ بھٹہ}), is a village near Eminabad in Gujranwala District in Punjab, Pakistan. The village is located near Eminabad Road.

== History ==
The history of Kot Bhutta is about 350 years. There is a shrine of a Sufi Saint, Pir Ahmad Din, and Urs is held every year. Famous personalities: Ch. Nizam U ddin Khan bhatti lamberdar of kot butta Haji Muhammad akram mehar (late) Haji Muhammad ashiq bhatti CH.Muhammad Shafi Bhatti (SP) Punjab police, CH.Muhammad khushi Bhatti Clerk Punjab University, Lahore
