= Mahreen Razaque Bhutto =

Pakistani politician

Member of the National Assembly of Pakistan
- In office 13 August 2018 – 10 August 2023
- Constituency: Reserved seat for women
- In office 1 June 2013 – 31 May 2018
- Constituency: Reserved seat for women
- In office 17 March 2008 – 16 March 2013
- Constituency: Reserved seat for women

Personal details
- Party: PPP (2008-present)

Mahreen Razaque Bhutto (Sindhi: مھرين رزاق ڀٽو;Urdu: مہرین رزاق بھٹو) is a Pakistani politician who has been a member of the National Assembly of Pakistan from August 2018 till August 2024. Previously she was member of the National Assembly from March 2008 to May 2018.

== Political career ==
She was elected to the National Assembly of Pakistan as a candidate of Pakistan Peoples Party (PPP) on a seat reserved for women from Sindh in the 2008 Pakistani general election.

She was re-elected to the National Assembly as a candidate of PPP on a reserved seat for women from Sindh in the 2013 Pakistani general election.

She was re-elected to the National Assembly as a candidate of PPP on a seat reserved for women from Sindh in the 2018 Pakistani general election.
