= Bhavesh Patel =

Bhavesh Patel may refer to:

- Bhavesh Patel (cricketer) (born 1985), English cricketer
- Bhavesh Patel (actor) (born 1980), American actor and writer
