= Avadh Bhatia =

Canadian physicist who studied ultrasonic waves

Avadh Behari Bhatia (1921–September 27, 1984) was an Indian-Canadian physicist who studied electronic transport theory and diffraction of light by ultrasonic waves. His research benefited the fields of condensed matter physics and astrophysics.

== Education and early career ==
Bhatia was born in India in 1921. He studied at the Universities of Allahabad in Uttar Pradesh and the University of Liverpool, where he met his second wife (under Herbert Fröhlich) in the UK. The couple were married in Rajasthan, India and lived in Gujarat for two years before Dr. Bhatia went to work at the University of Edinburgh under Max Born.

== Career in Canada ==
With a fellowship from the National Research Council, he moved to Canada in 1953, joining the University of Alberta two years later. He became a professor in the department in 1960, and was director of the Theoretical Physics Institute from 1964 to 1969.

He wrote in a chapter in Principles of Optics on the diffraction of light by ultrasonic waves and his book Ultrasonic Absorption was published by Oxford University Press in 1967. He co-authored Mechanics of Deformable Media with R.N. Singh. Some of his publications are under the name A.B. Bhatia.

== Personal life ==
Bhatia's second wife, Helen Forrester, was a British-born Canadian novelist and memoir writer. They met in Liverpool and had one son, Robert Bhatia. Robert wrote a book about his parents and their relationship called Passage Across the Mersey (2017).

== Death ==
Bhatia died after a long-term illness in 1985 and is buried in Saint Anthony Cemetery, Edmonton, Alberta, Canada.
