= Bhatia–Davis inequality =

In mathematics, the Bhatia–Davis inequality, named after Rajendra Bhatia and Chandler Davis, is an upper bound on the variance σ^{2} of any bounded probability distribution on the real line.

Despite its name, the inequality had previously been found by Muilwijk, based on Murthy and Sethi, 34 years before publication of the better-known article by Bhatia and Davis.

== Statement ==
Let m and M be the lower and upper bounds, respectively, for a set of real numbers a_{1}, ..., a_{n} , with a particular probability distribution. Let μ be the expected value of this distribution.

Then the Bhatia–Davis inequality states:

$$\sigma^2 \le (M - \mu)(\mu - m). \,$$

Equality holds if and only if every a_{j} in the set of values is equal either to M or to m.

== Proof ==
Since $m \leq A \leq M$,

$0 \leq \mathbb{E}[(M - A)(A - m)] = -\mathbb{E}[A^2] - m M + (m+M)\mu$.

Thus,

$\sigma^2 = \mathbb{E}[A^2] - \mu^2 \leq - m M + (m+M)\mu - \mu^2 = (M - \mu) (\mu - m)$.

== Extensions of the Bhatia–Davis inequality ==
If $\Phi$ is a positive and unital linear mapping of a C* -algebra $\mathcal{A}$ into a C* -algebra $\mathcal{B}$, and A is a self-adjoint element of $\mathcal{A}$ satisfying m $\leq$ A $\leq$ M, then:

$\Phi (A^2)-(\Phi A)^2\leq (M-\Phi A)(\Phi A - m)$.

If $\mathit{X}$ is a discrete random variable such that

$P (X=x_i)=p_i,$ where $i = 1, ..., n$, then:

$s_p^2=\sum_{1}^n p_ix_i^2-(\sum_{1}^n p_ix_i)^2\leq(M-\sum_{1}^n p_ix_i)(\sum_{1}^n p_ix_i-m)$,

where $0\leq p_i \leq1$ and $\sum_{1}^n p_i=1$.

== Comparisons to other inequalities ==
The Bhatia–Davis inequality is stronger than Popoviciu's inequality on variances (note, however, that Popoviciu's inequality does not require knowledge of the expectation or mean), as can be seen from the conditions for equality. Equality holds in Popoviciu's inequality if and only if half of the a_{j} are equal to the upper bounds and half of the a_{j} are equal to the lower bounds. Additionally, Sharma has made further refinements on the Bhatia–Davis inequality.

== See also ==
- Cramér–Rao bound
- Chapman–Robbins bound
- Popoviciu's inequality on variances
