= Norbert Wiener Center for Harmonic Analysis and Applications =

US research center

Coordinates: 38°59′18″N 76°56′21″W

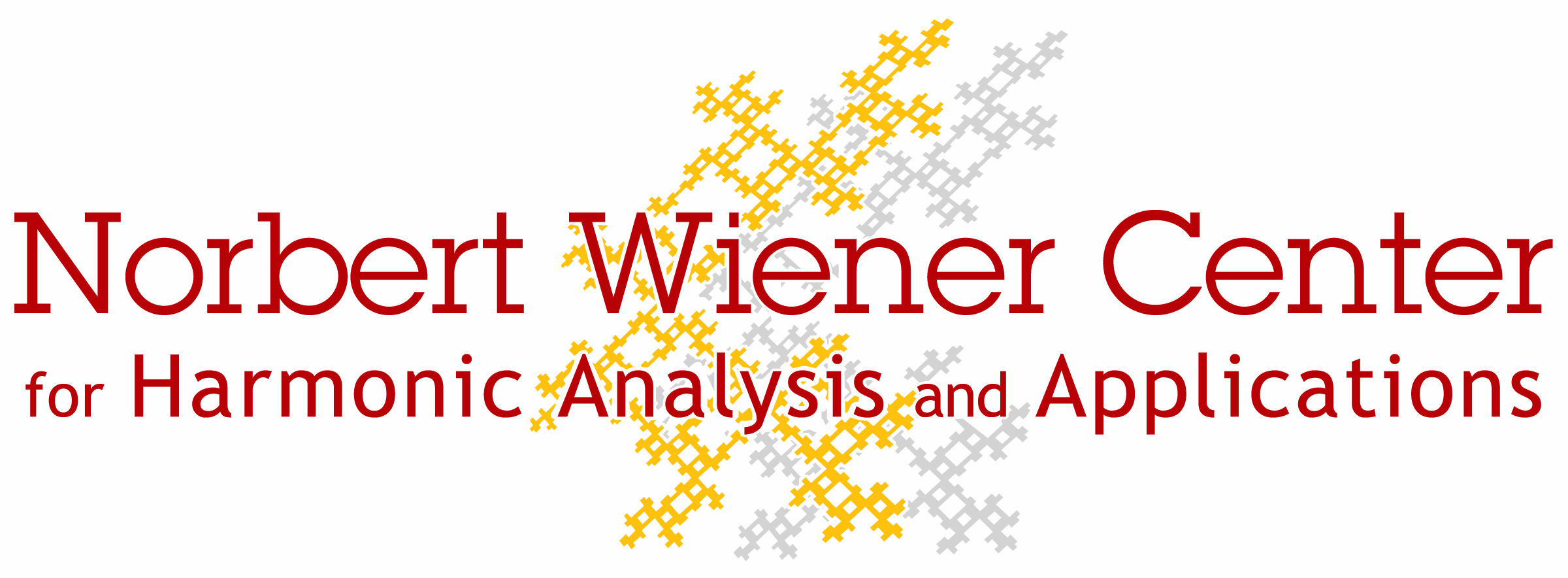
- Established: 2004
- Affiliations: University of Maryland, College Park
- Director: John J Benedetto
- Faculty: Radu Balan; John J Benedetto; Wojciech Czaja; Kasso A. Okoudjou
- Location: College Park, Maryland, United States
- Website: www.norbertwiener.umd.edu

The Norbert Wiener Center for Harmonic Analysis and Applications (NWC) is a division of the Mathematics Department in the University of Maryland College of Computer, Mathematical, and Natural Sciences devoted to research and education in pure and applied harmonic analysis. The center, named after scientist Norbert Wiener was founded in 2004 and is based out of the Mathematics Building on the University of Maryland, College Park campus. It is supported by the University of Maryland, the National Science Foundation, and local industries with which it interacts.

Currently, the Norbert Wiener Center is actively involved in research project involved with waveform design, dimension reduction, geospatial terrain and image processing, data fusion, phase retrieval frames, and analysis on graphs.

== February Fourier Talks ==
The Norbert Wiener Center hosts the annual conference, the February Fourier Talks (FFT). The first FFT was held in 2002 and 2003, and then annually since 2006. The aim of the annual FFT is to bring together researchers from academia, government, and industry, as a means to spur innovation and foster interaction in Harmonic Analysis and its Applications. The FFT lasts two days and consists of approximately 15 half-hour talks, a distinguished lecture, a colloquium, and a keynote lecture. The speakers are top researchers in pure and applied harmonic analysis in academia, government, and industry.

== Current Personnel ==
The Director of the NWC is John Benedetto. The faculty members include: John Benedetto, Radu Balan, Wojciech Czaja, and Kasso Okoudjou. The current Scientific Development Officers include Michael Dellomo, Jeffrey Sieracki, and Alfredo Nava-Tudela. The current postdoctoral fellows include Xuemei Chen and Benjamin Manning. The associate director of the center is Matthew Begué. A list of all other members, including all graduate students, can be found on the center's official website.
