= Peerzada Mian Shahzad Maqbool Bhutta =

Pakistani politician

Member of the Provincial Assembly of the Punjab
- In office 29 May 2013 – 31 May 2018

Personal details
- Born: 10 November 1982 (age 44) Multan
- Party: Pakistan Muslim League (N)

Peerzada Mian Shahzad Maqbool Bhutta (born 10 November 1982, Multan) is a Pakistani politician who was a Member of the Provincial Assembly of the Punjab, from May 2013 to May 2018.
