= Bhavesh Bhatia =

Indian sportspeople with a vision impairment

Personal details
- Born: 29 December 1970 (age 55) Maharashtra, India.
- Occupation: Entrepreneur
- Awards: National Award for the Empowerment of Persons with Disabilities

Bhavesh Chandubhai Bhatia (born 29 December 1970) is a visually disabled entrepreneur and founder of Sunrise Candles, based in Mahabaleshwar, Maharashtra, India. Sunrise Candles is a candle making company run majorly by visually disabled people. Bhavesh has been participating in paralympic category of games and has won 117 NAB, IBSA medals.

== Early life ==
Bhavesh was born with retina macular degeneration and had little sight while he was growing up. His mother had developed cancer and later died from her illness. His father was a caretaker at a guesthouse in Mahabaleshwar. Before starting Sunrise Candles, he worked as a telephone operator at a Hotel in Mahabaleshwar, Maharashtra. At the age of 23, Bhavesh lost his job.

== Struggle ==
Bhavesh Bhatia joined National Association For the Blind (NAB) and took training in candle making. He did a 4-month rehabilitation course where he was taught how to make candles for a living. At NAB, Bhavesh also took training in acupressure, braille and few other things.

According to Bhavesh, he wanted to start his own business for candle making but moulds were expensive that he could not afford. He started working as massage and acupressure therapist in hotels in Mahabaleshwar. This job helped him save money with which he bought a plain candle mould and 5 kg wax. He started making plain candles and worked as a street vendor in front of Holy Cross church in Mahabaleshwar. He used to set aside Rs 25 per day for next day's raw material.

Neeta, a resident of Bhayander, Mumbai, who visited Bhavesh's shop as a customer, struck a chord with him and decided to marry him despite stiff resistance from her family.

Bhavesh tried to get help from many sources but he could not get the technical and professional assistance though people helped him out of sympathy. He could not get loans from banks. He failed to get help from profession candle manufacturers and institutes. He failed to get expert advice on candle making. Once, a few miscreants threw all of his candles in gutter. To get an idea about candle designs, Bhavesh used to go to shopping complexes with his wife and tried to touch and feel the different varieties of candles on display.

== Sunrise Candles ==
A special scheme by NAB for blind people helped Bhavesh get a loan of Rs 15000 from Satara Bank. With this money, Bhatia purchased 15 kg of wax, two dyes and a hand cart. One of his friend, Niraj Chandan, who helped him in the early days, says, "I met Bhavesh Bhatia five years ago. He had put up a stall to sell candles near a church in Mahabaleshwar." Niraj went to Bhavesh's house where he made the candles. "I could not believe my eyes. He was doing it so well. I took photographs with my digital camera and put up a small website - www.sunrisecandles.in. We advertised on Google and started getting lot of orders." Then things began to change. Advertisements in Google spread their reach and they started getting orders. Bhavesh got small piece of land from one of his friends, and another friend, who was a builder, built a small candle making center on that land.

Sunrise candles, which employs a team of 3470 Visually Impaired people and Divyang, in 14 states of India now imports wax from UK and manufacture different kinds of candle which include pillar candles, floating candles, novelty candles, gel candles, toy shaped candles, fruit basket candle and traditional candles. They have developed more than 10700 Designer Scented, Plain and Aromatherapy candle designs. The client list of Sunrise candles includes Reliance Industries, Ranbaxy, Big Bazaar, Naroda Industries, Resilient Cosmecuticals, Rotary Club, Many Hotel Groups, etc.

== Wax Museum Made by blind ==
Bhavesh opened a Skill development center at Moleshwar village, near Mahabaleshwar, to train physically disabled people in the art of designer candle making. Training is provided in different aspects of candle making which largely depends on type of physical disability and personal aptitude of the person. This center is known as wax museum, Made By Blind. There are mixed reviews for this museum. According to few, it may not be a wax museum in the classical sense but for many it is a satisfying and inspiring visit for a social cause. The Wax Museum consists of lifestyle statues of eminent personalities, including of Sachin Tendulkar, Amitabh Bachchan, Shri, Narendra Modiji, Aamir Khan, and many more. This center also has a free hostel for blind students, free accommodation, free mess and free skill training facilities such as candle making, marketing. Educational trips are organised for school/college students and meditation seminars/motivational lectures are organised here.

== Other achievements ==
He received a National Award for the Empowerment of Persons with Disabilities in 2014 and again in 2019, in the self-employed and role model categories respectively.

Bhavesh has participated in paralympic games. Till now, he has won 114 Paralympic, NAB and IBSA medals in sports events.

- Divyangjan Udyog bhushan puraskar from Govt of Maharashtra by hands of Former Chief Minister Shri. Devendra Ji Fadanvis
- Shot put, discus throw and javelin throw gold medals in National Paralympic games, New Delhi, 2014
- Gold medal in shot put and silver medal in discus throw in National Paralympic 2012
- Gold medal in shot put, discus throw in Maharashtra state paralympics, Nasik, 2010, 2012
- Silver medal in javelin throw in Maharashtra state paralympics, Nasik, 2010, 2012
- Hon.Doctorate from #Rani Chennamma University Belagavi, Karnataka, 29 May-2019

== TV appearance ==
Bhavesh was called in Satyamev Jayate (TV series).
