= Rajendra Bhatia =

Indian mathematician, author, and educator (born 1952)

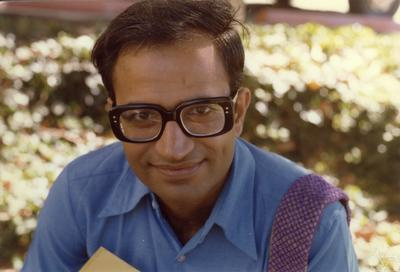
- Born: 1952 (age 73–74)
- Education: Delhi University Indian Statistical Institute
- Children: Gautam Bhatia
- Awards: Shanti Swarup Bhatnagar Award ILAS Hans Schneider prize INSA Medal for Young Scientist
- Scientific career
- Fields: Linear Algebra Hilbert Space Mathematics
- Workplaces: Ashoka University
- Doctoral advisor: K. R. Parthasarathy

Rajendra Bhatia (born 1952) is an Indian mathematician, author, and educator. He is currently a professor of mathematics at Ashoka University located in Sonipat, Haryana, India.

== Education ==
He studied at the University of Delhi, where he completed his BSc degree in physics and MSc degree in mathematics, and moved to the Indian Statistical Institute, Kolkata, where he completed his Ph.D. in 1982 under the probabilist K. R. Parthasarathy.

== Research ==
Bhatia's research interests include matrix inequalities, calculus of matrix functions, means of matrices, and connections between harmonic analysis, geometry and matrix analysis.

He is one of the eponyms of the Bhatia–Davis inequality.

== Academic life ==
Rajendra Bhatia founded the series "Texts and Readings in Mathematics" in 1992 and the series "Culture and History of Mathematics" on the history of Indian mathematics. He has served on the editorial boards of several major international journals such as "Linear Algebra and Its Applications," and the SIAM Journal on Matrix Analysis and Applications.

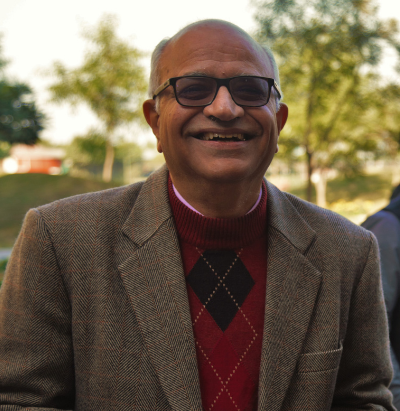
Bhatia while at Ashoka

== Awards ==
Bhatia was awarded the INSA Medal for Young Scientists in 1982. He won the Shanti Swarup Bhatnagar Prize for Science and Technology in Mathematical Science in 1995. In 2017 he was awarded the Hans Schneider Prize in Linear Algebra.

== Books ==
- Bhatia, Rajendra (1987). Perturbation Bounds for Matrix Eigenvalues. Longman.
- Bhatia, Rajendra (1997). Matrix Analysis. Springer, Graduate Texts in Mathematics.
- Bhatia, Rajendra (2007). Positive Definite Matrices. Princeton Series in Applied Mathematics.
- Bhatia, Rajendra. Fourier Series. The Mathematical Association of America.

== See also ==
- Bhatia–Davis inequality
