= Naseer Ahmad Bhutta =

Pakistani lawyer

Special Assistant to Prime Minister
- In office 2017–2018
- President: Mamnoon Hussain
- Prime Minister: Shahid Khaqan Abbasi

Additional Attorney General for Pakistan
- In office 2013–2016

Member National Assembly
- In office 2008–2013

Personal details
- Born: Lahore
- Children: two son, one is Advocate & one daughter
- Profession: Lawyer & advisor

Ch Naseer Ahmad Bhutta is Special Assistant to Prime Minister of Pakistan on Legal Affairs with effect from 5 December 2017, directly appointed by the PM Shahid Khaqan Abbasi. He is also a senior advocate of the Supreme Court and was a Member of the Pakistan National Assembly from NA-127 from 2008 to 2013 Lahore. He belongs to the Pakistan Muslim League (Nawaz) and is the president of its lawyers' forum. He was actively involved in leading the Lawyers' Movement against Pervez Musharraf's government for the restoration of the judiciary. He was appointed as the Additional Attorney General of Pakistan in October 2013 through orders of the Prime Minister and now he resigned from the post of Additional Attorney General and president of PML-N Lawyers Forum and appointed as Chief Information Commissioner Punjab. He belongs to a well known Bhutta Arain family of Punjab.

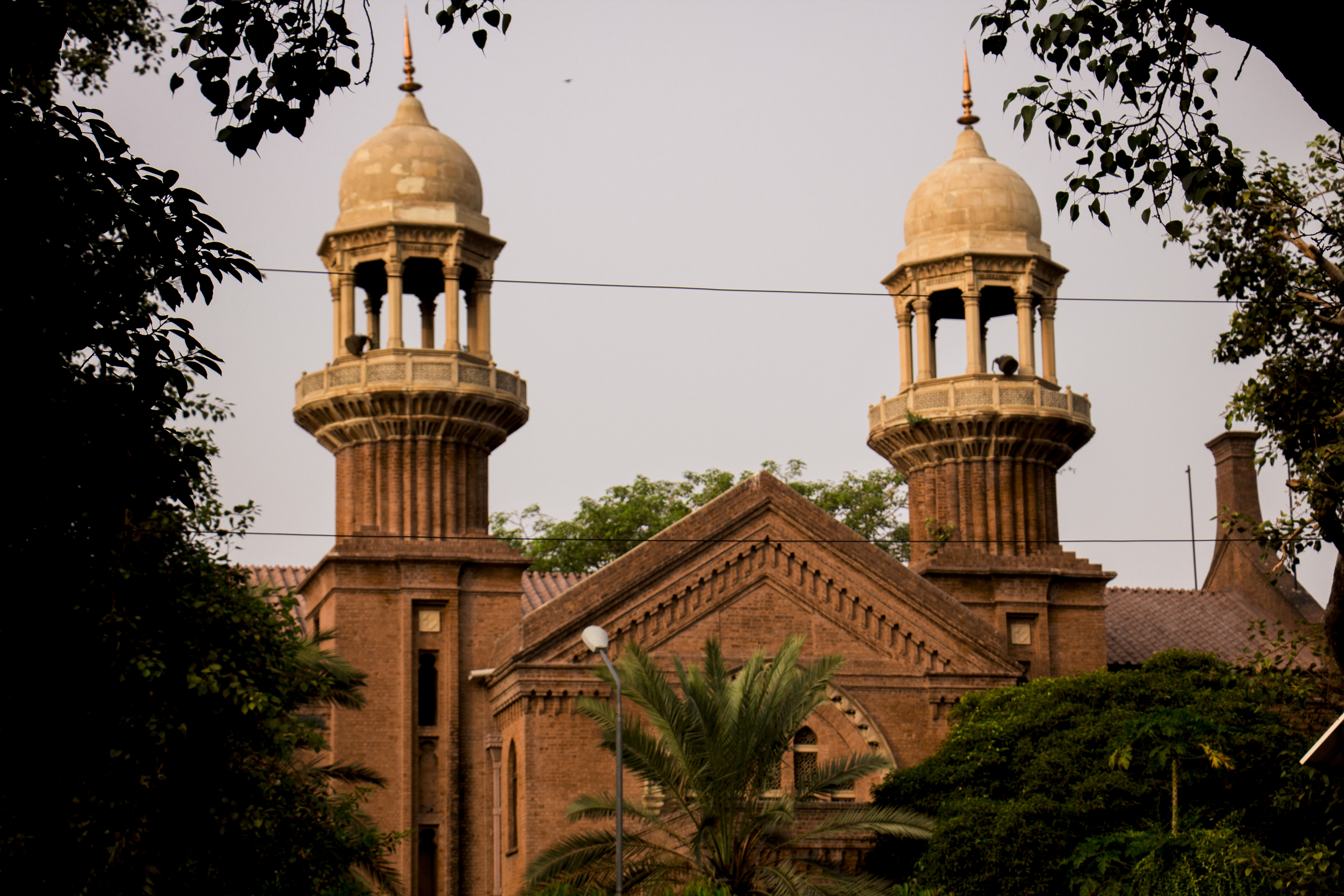
Lahore High Court

== Special Assistant to Prime Minister ==
He was appointed Special Assistant to Prime Minister Shahid Khaqan Abbasi in 2017 to look after legal issues, Lawyers issues and Law Officers and remained there till new general election of 2018.

== Member National Assembly ==
He was elected as a member National Assembly from NA-127 Lahore for the term 2008–2013 to represent Pakistan Muslim League N and remained member of opposition benches while Peoples party was in power and Yousaf Raza Gillani was prime minister.

== President Muslim League Lawyers Forum ==
He appointed President Pakistan Muslim League N Lawyers forum to mobilize legal fraternity.

== Information Commissioner ==
He was appointed information Commissioner by Government of the Punjab. Information Commission is an independent enforcement body constituted under the Punjab Transparency & Right to Information Act, 2013. He is responsible to make available required mechanisms for right to information, raise awareness, help public bodies to act with, train officers and decide public complaints.
