= Tiberiu Popoviciu =

Romanian mathematician

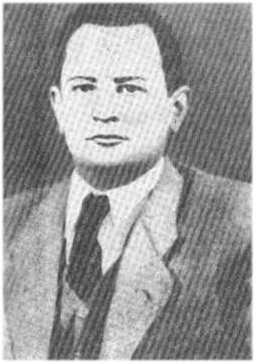
- Born: February 16, 1906; Arad, Hungary
- Died: October 29, 1975 (aged 69); Cluj-Napoca, Socialist Republic of Romania
- Resting place: Hajongard Cemetery, Cluj-Napoca
- Education: Paris-Sorbonne University; University of Bucharest
- Known for: Popoviciu's inequality Popoviciu's inequality on variances
- Spouse: Elena Moldovan Popoviciu
- Scientific career
- Fields: Mathematics
- Workplaces: University of Cernăuți; University of Bucharest; University of Iași; University of Cluj
- Thesis: Sur quelques propriétés des fonctions d'une ou de deux variables réelles (1933)
- Doctoral advisor: Paul Montel
- Doctoral students: Elena Moldovan Popoviciu

Tiberiu Popoviciu (February 16, 1906–October 29, 1975) was a Romanian mathematician and the namesake of Popoviciu's inequality and Popoviciu's inequality on variances.

The Tiberiu Popoviciu High School of Computer Science in Cluj-Napoca is named after him.

In 1951 he founded a research institute which now bears his name: Tiberiu Popoviciu Institute of Numerical Analysis.

== Biography ==
Popoviciu was born in Arad in 1906, and attended high school in his hometown, the school which is now the Moise Nicoară National College. He graduated from the University of Bucharest, and got his doctorate in 1933 under Paul Montel from Paris-Sorbonne University.

He was a lecturer at the Universities of Cernăuți, Bucharest, and Iași. In 1946 he was appointed professor at the University of Cluj. On June 4, 1937 Popoviciu was elected a corresponding member of the Romanian Academy of Sciences. In November 1948 he was elected a corresponding member of the Romanian Academy. He became full member of the mathematical sciences section of the Academy on March 20, 1963.

He married his former student, Elena Moldovan Popoviciu, in 1964; she also became a notable functional analyst. He died in 1975 in Cluj-Napoca, and is buried in the city's Hajongard Cemetery.
