= Axial symmetry =

Property of objects which appear unchanged after some rotation about an axis

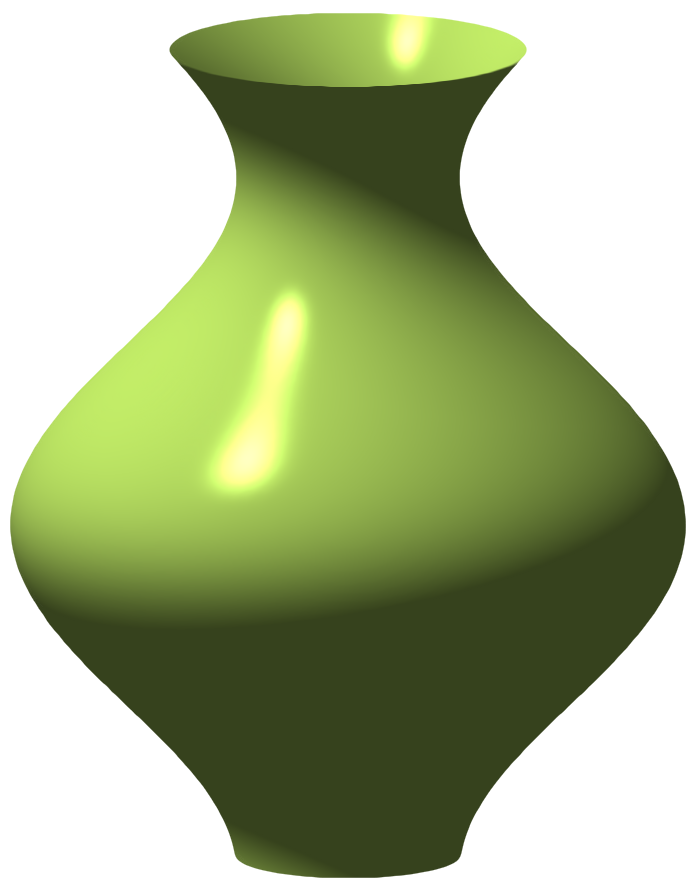
A surface of revolution has axial symmetry around an axis in 3-dimensions.

Axial symmetry is symmetry around an axis or line (geometry). An object is said to be axially symmetric if its appearance is unchanged if transformed around an axis. The main types of axial symmetry are reflection symmetry and rotational symmetry (including circular symmetry for plane figures and cylindrical symmetry for surfaces of revolution). For example, a baseball bat (without trademark or other design), or a plain white tea saucer, looks the same if it is rotated by any angle about the line passing lengthwise through its center, so it is axially symmetric.

Axial symmetry can also be discrete with a fixed angle of rotation, 360°/n for n-fold symmetry.

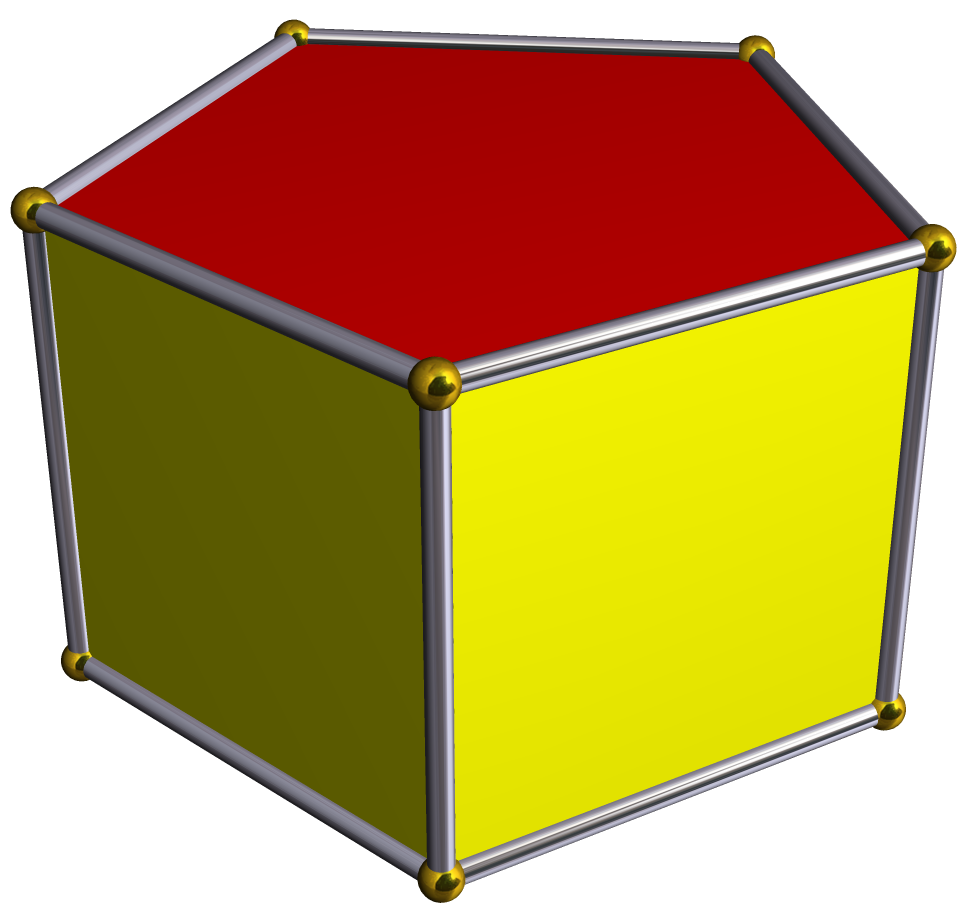
Discrete axial symmetry, order 5, in a pentagonal prism

== See also ==
- Axiality (geometry), the degree of axial symmetry
- Chiral symmetry describes the use in quantum mechanics
