= Outer product =

Vector operation

In linear algebra, the outer product of two coordinate vectors is the matrix whose entries are all products of an element in the first vector with an element in the second vector. If the two coordinate vectors have dimensions m and n, then their outer product is an m × n matrix. More generally, given two tensors (multidimensional arrays of numbers), their outer product is a tensor. The outer product of tensors is also referred to as their tensor product, and can be used to define the tensor algebra.

The outer product contrasts with:

- The dot product (a special case of "inner product"), which takes a pair of coordinate vectors as input and produces a scalar
- The Kronecker product, which takes a pair of matrices as input and produces a block matrix
- The Hadamard product, which is the element-wise product
- Standard matrix multiplication

== Definition ==
Given two column vectors, $\mathbf u$ of size $m \times 1$ and $\mathbf v$ of size $n \times 1$,
$$\mathbf{u} = \begin{bmatrix} u_1 \\ u_2 \\ \vdots \\ u_m \end{bmatrix},
\quad
\mathbf{v} = \begin{bmatrix} v_1 \\ v_2 \\ \vdots \\ v_n \end{bmatrix}$$
their outer product $\mathbf{u}\mathbf{v}^\mathsf{T}$, sometimes denoted $\mathbf{u} \otimes \mathbf{v}$, is the matrix product of the column vector $\mathbf u$ times the row vector $\mathbf v^\mathsf T$. This is an $m \times n$ matrix whose entries are each possible product of one element of $\mathbf u$ times one element of $\mathbf v$:
$$\mathbf{u} \otimes \mathbf{v}
= \mathbf{u}\mathbf{v}^\mathsf{T}
= \begin{bmatrix}u_1 \\ u_2 \\ \dots \\ u_m\end{bmatrix}
\begin{bmatrix}v_1 & v_2 & \dots & v_n\end{bmatrix}
= \begin{bmatrix}
u_1v_1 & u_1v_2 & \dots & u_1v_n \\
u_2v_1 & u_2v_2 & \dots & u_2v_n \\
\vdots & \vdots & \ddots & \vdots \\
u_mv_1 & u_mv_2 & \dots & u_mv_n
\end{bmatrix}.$$
Or, in index notation,
$$(\mathbf{u} \otimes \mathbf{v})_{ij} = u_i v_j.$$

The outer product of two vectors always has rank $1$, and conversely every matrix of rank $1$ can be written as an outer product.

For complex-valued vectors, it is common to define the outer product in terms of the conjugate transpose of $\mathbf{v}$, denoted $\mathbf{v}^\dagger$, $\mathbf{v}^\textsf{H}$, or $\mathbf{v}^*$:
$$\mathbf{u} \otimes \mathbf{v} = \mathbf{u} \mathbf{v}^\dagger.$$
The conjugate transpose of a matrix results from taking the complex conjugate of each entry in the transpose of a matrix.

=== Contrast with Euclidean inner product ===
If $m = n,$ then one can take the matrix product in the opposite order, of a row vector times a column vector, to obtain a scalar (or $1 \times 1$ matrix):
$$\left\langle\mathbf{u}, \mathbf{v}\right\rangle = \mathbf{u}^\textsf{T} \mathbf{v} = u_1v_1 + u_2v_2 + \dots + u_nv_n.$$
This is the standard inner product (or dot product) for the Euclidean vector space $\R^n$. The dot product is the trace of the outer product. Unlike the dot product, the outer product is not commutative.

Multiplication of a vector $\mathbf{w}$ by the matrix $\mathbf{u} \otimes \mathbf{v}$ can be written in terms of the inner product, using the relation $\left(\mathbf{u} \otimes \mathbf{v}\right)\mathbf{w} = (\mathbf{u} \mathbf{v}^\mathsf{T})\mathbf{w} = \mathbf{u} (\mathbf{v}^\mathsf{T}\mathbf{w}) = \mathbf{u}\left\langle\mathbf{v}, \mathbf{w}\right\rangle$.

=== The outer product of tensors ===
Given two tensors $\mathbf{u}, \mathbf{v}$ of orders $m$ and $n$, with dimensions $(k_1, k_2, \dots, k_m)$ and $(l_1, l_2, \dots, l_n)$ respectively, their outer product $\mathbf{u} \otimes \mathbf{v}$ is a tensor of order $m+n$, with dimensions $(k_1, k_2, \dots, k_m, l_1, l_2, \dots, l_n)$, and entries
$$(\mathbf{u} \otimes \mathbf{v})_{i_1, i_2, \dots i_m, j_1, j_2, \dots, j_n} = u_{i_1, i_2, \dots, i_m} v_{j_1, j_2, \dots, j_n},$$

for the indices $1\le i_1\le k_1,\ 1\le i_2\le k_2\dots, \ 1\le i_m \le k_m$ and $1\le j_1 \le l_1, \ 1\le j_2 \le l_2\dots, \ 1\le j_n \le l_n$. For example, if $\mathbf{A}$ is of order 3 with dimensions $(3, 5, 7)$ and $\mathbf{B}$ is of order 2 with dimensions $(10, 100),$ then their outer product $\mathbf{C}$ is of order 5 with dimensions $(3, 5, 7, 10, 100).$ If $\mathbf{A}$ has a component A_{[2, 2, 4]} = 11 and $\mathbf{B}$ has a component B_{[8, 88]} = 13, then the component of $\mathbf{C}$ formed by the outer product is C_{[2, 2, 4, 8, 88]} = 143.

=== Connection with the Kronecker product ===
The outer product and Kronecker product are closely related; in fact the same symbol is commonly used to denote both operations.

If
$$\mathbf{u} = \begin{bmatrix}1 & 2 & 3\end{bmatrix}^\textsf{T}$$
and
$$\mathbf{v} = \begin{bmatrix}4 & 5\end{bmatrix}^\textsf{T}$$
, we have:
$$\begin{align}
\mathbf{u} \otimes_\text{Kron} \mathbf{v} &= \begin{bmatrix} 4 \\ 5 \\ 8 \\ 10 \\ 12 \\ 15\end{bmatrix}, &
\mathbf{u} \otimes_\text{outer} \mathbf{v} &= \begin{bmatrix} 4 & 5 \\ 8 & 10 \\ 12 & 15\end{bmatrix}
\end{align}$$

In the case of column vectors, the Kronecker product can be viewed as a form of vectorization (or flattening) of the outer product. In particular, for two column vectors $\mathbf{u}$ and $\mathbf{v}$, we can write:
$$\mathbf{u} \otimes_{\text{Kron}} \mathbf{v} = \operatorname{vec}(\mathbf{v} \otimes_\text{outer} \mathbf{u})$$

(The order of the vectors is reversed on the right side of the equation.)

Another similar identity that further highlights the similarity between the operations is
$$\mathbf{u} \otimes_{\text{Kron}} \mathbf{v}^\textsf{T} = \mathbf u \mathbf{v}^\textsf{T} = \mathbf{u} \otimes_{\text{outer}} \mathbf{v}$$

where the order of vectors needs not be flipped. The middle expression uses matrix multiplication, where the vectors are considered as column/row matrices.

=== Connection with the matrix product ===
Given a pair of matrices $\mathbf{A}$ of size $m\times p$ and $\mathbf{B}$ of size $p\times n$, consider the matrix product $\mathbf{C} = \mathbf{A}\,\mathbf{B}$ defined as usual as a matrix of size $m\times n$.

Now let $\mathbf a^\text{col}_k$ be the $k$-th column vector of $\mathbf A$ and let $\mathbf b^\text{row}_k$ be the $k$-th row vector of $\mathbf B$. Then $\mathbf{C}$ can be expressed as a sum of column-by-row outer products:
$$\mathbf{C} = \mathbf{A}\, \mathbf{B} =
\left(
\sum_{k=1}^p {A}_{ik}\, {B}_{kj}
\right)_{
\begin{matrix} 1\le i \le m \\[-20pt] 1 \le j\le n \end{matrix}
} =
\begin{bmatrix} & & \\ \mathbf a^\text{col}_{1} & \cdots & \mathbf a^\text{col}_{p} \\ & & \end{bmatrix}
\begin{bmatrix} & \mathbf b^\text{row}_{1} & \\ & \vdots & \\ & \mathbf b^\text{row}_{p} & \end{bmatrix}
= \sum_{k=1}^p \mathbf a^\text{col}_k \mathbf b^\text{row}_k$$
This expression has duality with the more common one as a matrix built with row-by-column inner product entries (or dot product): $C_{ij} = \langle{\mathbf a^\text{row}_i,\,\mathbf b_j^\text{col}}\rangle$

This relation is relevant in the application of the Singular Value Decomposition (SVD) (and Spectral Decomposition as a special case). In particular, the decomposition can be interpreted as the sum of outer products of each left ($\mathbf{u}_k$) and right ($\mathbf{v}_k$) singular vectors, scaled by the corresponding nonzero singular value $\sigma_k$:
$$\mathbf{A} = \mathbf{U \Sigma V^T} = \sum_{k=1}^{\operatorname{rank}(A)}(\mathbf{u}_k \otimes \mathbf{v}_k) \, \sigma_k$$

This result implies that $\mathbf{A}$ can be expressed as a sum of rank-1 matrices with spectral norm $\sigma_k$ in decreasing order. This explains the fact why, in general, the last terms contribute less, which motivates the use of the truncated SVD as an approximation. The first term is the least squares fit of a matrix to an outer product of vectors.

== Properties ==
The outer product of vectors satisfies the following properties:
$$\begin{align}
(\mathbf{u} \otimes \mathbf{v})^\textsf{T} &= (\mathbf{v} \otimes \mathbf{u}) \\
(\mathbf{v} + \mathbf{w}) \otimes \mathbf{u} &= \mathbf{v} \otimes \mathbf{u} + \mathbf{w} \otimes \mathbf{u} \\
\mathbf{u} \otimes (\mathbf{v} + \mathbf{w}) &= \mathbf{u} \otimes \mathbf{v} + \mathbf{u} \otimes \mathbf{w} \\
c (\mathbf{v} \otimes \mathbf{u}) &= (c\mathbf{v}) \otimes \mathbf{u} = \mathbf{v} \otimes (c\mathbf{u})
\end{align}$$

The outer product of tensors satisfies the additional associativity property:
$$(\mathbf{u} \otimes \mathbf{v}) \otimes \mathbf{w} =
\mathbf{u} \otimes (\mathbf{v} \otimes \mathbf{w})$$

=== Rank of an outer product ===
If u and v are both nonzero, then the outer product matrix uv^{T} always has matrix rank 1. Indeed, the columns of the outer product are all proportional to u. Thus they are all linearly dependent on that one column, hence the matrix is of rank one.

("Matrix rank" should not be confused with "tensor order", or "tensor degree", which is sometimes referred to as "rank".)

== Definition (abstract) ==
Let V and W be two vector spaces over the same field. The outer product of $\mathbf v \in V$ and $\mathbf w \in W$ is the element $\mathbf v \otimes \mathbf w \in V \otimes W$.

If W is an inner product space, then it is possible to define the outer product as a linear map W → V. In this case, the linear map $\mathbf x \mapsto \langle \mathbf w, \mathbf x\rangle$ is an element of the dual space of W, as this maps linearly a vector into its underlying field, of which $\langle \mathbf w, \mathbf x\rangle$ is an element. The outer product is then given by
$$\begin{array}{rcl}
\mathbf v \otimes \mathbf w \colon & W &\to V\\
&\mathbf x &\mapsto (\mathbf v \otimes \mathbf w) (\mathbf x) = \left\langle \mathbf w,\mathbf x\right\rangle\mathbf v
\end{array}$$

This shows why a conjugate transpose of w is commonly taken in the complex case.

== In programming languages ==
In some programming languages, given a two-argument function f (or a binary operator), the outer product, f, of two one-dimensional arrays, A and B, is a two-dimensional array C such that C[i, j] = f(A[i], B[j]). This is syntactically represented in various ways: in APL, as the infix binary operator ∘.f; in J, as the postfix adverb f/; in R, as the function outer(A, B, f) or the special %o%; in Mathematica, as Outer[f, A, B]. In MATLAB, the function kron(A, B) is used for this product. These often generalize to multi-dimensional arguments, and more than two arguments.

In the Python library NumPy, the outer product can be computed with function np.outer(). In contrast, np.kron results in a flat array. The outer product of multidimensional arrays can be computed using np.multiply.outer.

== Applications ==
As the outer product is closely related to the Kronecker product, some of the applications of the Kronecker product use outer products. These applications are found in quantum theory, signal processing, and image compression.

=== Spinors ===
Suppose s, t, w, z ∈ C so that (s, t) and (w, z) are in C^{2}. Then the outer product of these complex 2-vectors is an element of M(2, C), the 2 × 2 complex matrices:
$$\begin{pmatrix} sw & tw \\ sz & tz \end{pmatrix}.$$
The determinant of this matrix is swtz − sztw = 0 because of the commutative property of C.

In the theory of spinors in three dimensions, these matrices are associated with isotropic vectors due to this null property. Élie Cartan described this construction in 1937, but it was introduced by Wolfgang Pauli in 1927 so that M(2,C) has come to be called Pauli algebra.

=== Concepts ===
The block form of outer products is useful in classification. Concept analysis is a study that depends on certain outer products:

When a vector has only zeros and ones as entries, it is called a logical vector, a special case of a logical matrix. The logical operation and takes the place of multiplication. The outer product of two logical vectors (u_{i}) and (v_{j}) is given by the logical matrix $\left(a_{ij}\right) = \left(u_i \land v_j\right)$. This type of matrix is used in the study of binary relations, and is called a rectangular relation or a cross-vector.

== See also ==
- Dyadics
- Householder transformation
- Norm (mathematics)
- Ricci calculus
- Scatter matrix

=== Products ===
- Cartesian product
- Cross product
- Exterior product
- Hadamard product (matrices)

=== Duality ===
- Bra–ket notation for outer product
- Complex conjugate
- Conjugate transpose
- Transpose
