= Affine involution =

Linear or affine transformation which is its own inverse

In Euclidean geometry, an affine involution is an involution which is a linear or affine transformation over the Euclidean space $\R^n$. Such involutions are easy to characterize and they can be described geometrically.

== Linear involutions ==
To give a linear involution is the same as giving an involutory matrix, a square matrix A such that
$$\bold A^2 =  \bold I \quad\quad\quad\quad (1)$$
where I is the identity matrix.

It is a quick check that a square matrix D whose elements are all zero off the main diagonal and ±1 on the diagonal, that is, a signature matrix of the form

$$\bold D = \begin{pmatrix}
\pm 1   & 0       & \cdots & 0       & 0      \\
0       & \pm 1   & \cdots & 0       & 0      \\
\vdots  & \vdots  & \ddots & \vdots  & \vdots \\
0       & 0       & \cdots & \pm 1   & 0      \\
0       & 0       & \cdots & 0       & \pm 1
\end{pmatrix}$$

satisfies (1), i.e. is the matrix of a linear involution. It turns out that all the matrices satisfying (1) are of the form
$$\bold A =  \bold U^{-1} \bold{DU},$$
where U is invertible and D is as above. That is to say, the matrix of any linear involution is of the form D up to a matrix similarity. Geometrically this means that any linear involution can be obtained by taking oblique reflections against any number from 0 through n hyperplanes going through the origin. (The term oblique reflection as used here includes ordinary reflections.)

One can easily verify that A represents a linear involution if and only if A has the form
$$\bold A = \pm (2 \bold P - \bold I)$$
for a linear projection P.

== Affine involutions ==
If A represents a linear involution, then x→A(x−b)+b is an affine involution. One can check that any affine involution in fact has this form. Geometrically, this means that any affine involution can be obtained by taking oblique reflections against any number from 0 through n hyperplanes going through a point b.

Affine involutions can be categorized by the dimension of the affine space of fixed points; this corresponds to the number of values 1 on the diagonal of the similar matrix D (see above), i.e., the dimension of the eigenspace for eigenvalue 1.

The affine involutions in $}\mathbb{R^3$ are:

- the identity
- the reflection in respect to a point
- the oblique reflection in respect to a line
- the oblique reflection in respect to a plane

== Isometric involutions ==
In the case that the eigenspace for eigenvalue 1 is the orthogonal complement of that for eigenvalue −1, i.e., every eigenvector with eigenvalue 1 is orthogonal to every eigenvector with eigenvalue −1, such an affine involution is an isometry. The two extreme cases for which this always applies are the identity function and inversion in a point.

The other involutive isometries are inversion in a line (in 2D, 3D, and up; this is in 2D a reflection, and in 3D a rotation about the line by 180°), inversion in a plane (in 3D and up; in 3D this is a reflection in a plane), inversion in a 3D space (in 3D: the identity), etc.
