= Spinors in three dimensions =

Spin representations of the SO(3) group

In mathematics, the spinor concept as specialised to three dimensions can be treated by means of the traditional notions of dot product and cross product. This is part of the detailed algebraic discussion of the rotation group SO(3).

== Formulation ==
The association of a spinor with a 2×2 complex traceless Hermitian matrix was formulated by Élie Cartan.

In detail, given a vector x = (x_{1}, x_{2}, x_{3}) of real (or complex) numbers, one can associate the complex matrix

$$\vec{x} \rightarrow X \ =\left(\begin{matrix}x_3&x_1-ix_2\\x_1+ix_2&-x_3\end{matrix}\right).$$

In physics, this is often written as a dot product $X\equiv {\vec \sigma}\cdot{\vec x}$, where ${\vec \sigma}\equiv (\sigma_1, \sigma_2, \sigma_3)$ is the vector form of Pauli matrices. Matrices of this form have the following properties, which relate them intrinsically to the geometry of 3-space:

- $\det X = -|{\vec x}|^2$, where $\det$ denotes the determinant.
- $X^2 = |{\vec x}|^2I$, where I is the identity matrix.
- $\frac{1}{2}(XY+YX)=({\vec x}\cdot{\vec y})I$
- $\frac{1}{2}(XY-YX)=iZ$ where Z is the matrix associated to the cross product ${\vec z} = {\vec x} \times {\vec y}$.
- If ${\vec u}$ is a unit vector, then $-UXU$ is the matrix associated with the vector that results from reflecting ${\vec x}$ in the plane orthogonal to ${\vec u}$.

The last property can be used to simplify rotational operations. It is an elementary fact from linear algebra that any rotation in 3-space factors as a composition of two reflections. (More generally, any orientation-reversing orthogonal transformation is either a reflection or the product of three reflections.) Thus if R is a rotation which decomposes as the reflection in the plane perpendicular to a unit vector ${\vec u}_1$ followed by the reflection in the plane perpendicular to ${\vec u}_2$, then the matrix $U_2U_1XU_1U_2$ represents the rotation of the vector ${\vec x}$ through R.

Having effectively encoded all the rotational linear geometry of 3-space into a set of complex 2×2 matrices, it is natural to ask what role, if any, the 2×1 matrices (i.e., the column vectors) play. Provisionally, a spinor is a column vector

$$\xi=\left[\begin{matrix}\xi_1\\\xi_2\end{matrix}\right],$$
with complex entries ξ_{1} and ξ_{2}.

The space of spinors is evidently acted upon by complex 2×2 matrices. As shown above, the product of two reflections in a pair of unit vectors defines a 2×2 matrix whose action on euclidean vectors is a rotation. So there is an action of rotations on spinors. However, there is one important caveat: the factorization of a rotation is not unique. Clearly, if $X \mapsto RXR^{-1}$ is a representation of a rotation, then replacing R by −R will yield the same rotation. In fact, one can easily show that this is the only ambiguity which arises. Thus the action of a rotation on a spinor is always double-valued.

== History ==
There were some precursors to Cartan's work with 2×2 complex matrices: Wolfgang Pauli had used these matrices so intensively that elements of a certain basis of a four-dimensional subspace are called Pauli matrices σ_{i}, so that the Hermitian matrix is written as a Pauli vector ${\vec x} \cdot {\vec \sigma}.$ In the mid 19th century the algebraic operations of this algebra of four complex dimensions were studied as biquaternions.

Michael Stone and Paul Goldbart, in Mathematics for Physics, contest this, saying, "The spin representations were discovered by ´Elie Cartan in 1913, some years before they were needed in physics."

== Formulation using isotropic vectors ==
Spinors can be constructed directly from isotropic vectors in 3-space without using the quaternionic construction. To motivate this introduction of spinors, suppose that X is a matrix representing a vector x in complex 3-space. Suppose further that x is isotropic: i.e.,

$${\mathbf x}\cdot{\mathbf x} = x_1^2+x_2^2+x_3^2=0.$$

Then since the determinant of X is zero there is a proportionality between its rows or columns. Thus the matrix may be written as an outer product of two complex 2-vectors:

$$X=2\left[\begin{matrix}\xi_1\\\xi_2\end{matrix}\right]\left[\begin{matrix}-\xi_2&\xi_1\end{matrix}\right].$$

This factorization yields an overdetermined system of equations in the coordinates of the vector x:

$$\left.\begin{matrix} \xi_1^2-\xi_2^2&=x_1\\ i(\xi_1^2+\xi_2^2)&=x_2\\ -2\xi_1\xi_2&=x_3 \end{matrix}\right\}$$	1

subject to the constraint

$x_1^2+x_2^2+x_3^2=0.$	2

This system admits the solutions

$\xi_1=\pm \sqrt{\frac{x_1-ix_2}{2}},\quad \xi_2=\pm \sqrt{\frac{-x_1-ix_2}{2}}.$	3

Either choice of sign solves the system (1). Thus a spinor may be viewed as an isotropic vector, along with a choice of sign. Note that because of the logarithmic branching, it is impossible to choose a sign consistently so that (3) varies continuously along a full rotation among the coordinates x. In spite of this ambiguity of the representation of a rotation on a spinor, the rotations do act unambiguously by a fractional linear transformation on the ratio ξ_{1}:ξ_{2} since one choice of sign in the solution (3) forces the choice of the second sign. In particular, the space of spinors is a projective representation of the orthogonal group.

As a consequence of this point of view, spinors may be regarded as a kind of "square root" of isotropic vectors. Specifically, introducing the matrix

$$C=\left(\begin{matrix}0&1\\-1&0\end{matrix}\right),$$

the system (1) is equivalent to solving X = 2 ξ ^{t}ξ C for the undetermined spinor ξ.

A fortiori, if the roles of ξ and x are now reversed, the form Q(ξ) = x defines, for each spinor ξ, a vector x quadratically in the components of ξ. If this quadratic form is polarized, it determines a bilinear vector-valued form on spinors Q(μ, ξ). This bilinear form then transforms tensorially under a reflection or a rotation.

== Reality ==
The above considerations apply equally well whether the original euclidean space under consideration is real or complex. When the space is real, however, spinors possess some additional structure which in turn facilitates a complete description of the representation of the rotation group. Suppose, for simplicity, that the inner product on 3-space has positive-definite signature:

$\left|x\right|^2 = x_1^2 + x^2_2 + x_3^2$	4

With this convention, real vectors correspond to Hermitian matrices. Furthermore, real rotations preserving the form (4) correspond (in the double-valued sense) to unitary matrices of determinant one. In modern terms, this presents the special unitary group SU(2) as a double cover of SO(3). As a consequence, the spinor Hermitian product

$\langle\mu|\xi\rangle = \bar{\mu}_1\xi_1+\bar{\mu}_2\xi_2$	5

is preserved by all rotations, and therefore is canonical.

If, however, the signature of the inner product on 3-space is indefinite (i.e., non-degenerate, but also not positive definite), then the foregoing analysis must be adjusted to reflect this. Suppose then that the length form on 3-space is given by:

$\left|\mathbf{x}\right|^2 = x_1^2 - x^2_2 + x_3^2$	4′

Then the construction of spinors of the preceding sections proceeds, but with $x_2$ replacing $i$ $x_2$ in all the formulas. With this new convention, the matrix associated to a real vector $(x_1,x_2,x_3)$ is itself real:

$$\left(\begin{matrix}x_3&x_1-x_2\\x_1+x_2&-x_3\end{matrix}\right)$$.

The form (5) is no longer invariant under a real rotation (or reversal), since the group stabilizing (4′) is now a Lorentz group O(2,1). Instead, the anti-Hermitian form

$$\langle\mu|\xi\rangle = \bar{\mu}_1\xi_2-\bar{\mu}_2\xi_1$$

defines the appropriate notion of inner product for spinors in this metric signature. This form is invariant under transformations in the connected component of the identity of O(2,1).

In either case, the quartic form

$$\langle\mu|\xi\rangle^2 = \hbox{length}\left(Q(\bar{\mu},\xi)\right)^2$$

is fully invariant under O(3) (or O(2,1), respectively), where Q is the vector-valued bilinear form described in the previous section. The fact that this is a quartic invariant, rather than quadratic, has an important consequence. If one confines attention to the group of special orthogonal transformations, then it is possible unambiguously to take the square root of this form and obtain an identification of spinors with their duals. In the language of representation theory, this implies that there is only one irreducible spin representation of SO(3) (or SO(2,1)) up to isomorphism. If, however, reversals (e.g., reflections in a plane) are also allowed, then it is no longer possible to identify spinors with their duals owing to a change of sign on the application of a reflection. Thus there are two irreducible spin representations of O(3) (or O(2,1)), sometimes called the pin representations.

== Reality structures ==
The differences between these two signatures can be codified by the notion of a reality structure on the space of spinors. Informally, this is a prescription for taking a complex conjugate of a spinor, but in such a way that this may not correspond to the usual conjugate per the components of a spinor. Specifically, a reality structure is specified by a Hermitian 2 × 2 matrix K whose product with itself is the identity matrix: K^{2} = Id. The conjugate of a spinor with respect to a reality structure K is defined by

$$\xi^* = K\bar{\xi}.$$

The particular form of the inner product on vectors (e.g., (4) or (4′)) determines a reality structure (up to a factor of -1) by requiring

$\bar{X}=KXK\,$, whenever X is a matrix associated to a real vector.

Thus K = i C is the reality structure in Euclidean signature (4), and K = Id is that for signature (4′). With a reality structure in hand, one has the following results:

- X is the matrix associated to a real vector if, and only if,
  $$\bar{X} = K X K\,.$$
- If μ and ξ is a spinor, then the inner product
  $$\langle\mu|\xi\rangle = i\,^t\mu^* C \xi$$
  determines a Hermitian form which is invariant under proper orthogonal transformations.

== Examples in physics ==
=== Spinors of the Pauli spin matrices ===
Often, the first example of spinors that a student of physics encounters are the 2×1 spinors used in Pauli's theory of electron spin. The Pauli matrices are a vector of three 2×2 matrices that are used as spin operators.

Given a unit vector in 3 dimensions, for example (a, b, c), one takes a dot product with the Pauli spin matrices to obtain a spin matrix for spin in the direction of the unit vector.

The eigenvectors of that spin matrix are the spinors for spin-1/2 oriented in the direction given by the vector.

Example: u = (0.8, -0.6, 0) is a unit vector. Dotting this with the Pauli spin matrices gives the matrix:

$$S_u = (0.8,-0.6,0.0)\cdot \vec{\sigma}=0.8 \sigma_{1}-0.6\sigma_{2}+0.0\sigma_{3} = \begin{bmatrix}
0.0 & 0.8+0.6i \\
0.8-0.6i & 0.0
\end{bmatrix}$$

The eigenvectors may be found by the usual methods of linear algebra, but a convenient trick is to note that a Pauli spin matrix is an involutory matrix, that is, the square of the above matrix is the identity matrix.

Thus a (matrix) solution to the eigenvector problem with eigenvalues of ±1 is simply 1 ± S_{u}. That is,

$$S_u (1\pm S_u) = \pm 1 (1 \pm S_u)$$

One can then choose either of the columns of the eigenvector matrix as the vector solution, provided that the column chosen is not zero. Taking the first column of the above, eigenvector solutions for the two eigenvalues are:

$$\begin{bmatrix}
1.0+ (0.0)\\
0.0 +(0.8-0.6i)
\end{bmatrix},
\begin{bmatrix}
1.0- (0.0)\\
0.0-(0.8-0.6i)
\end{bmatrix}$$

The trick used to find the eigenvectors is related to the concept of ideals, that is, the matrix eigenvectors (1 ± S_{u})/2 are projection operators or idempotents and therefore each generates an ideal in the Pauli algebra. The same trick works in any Clifford algebra, in particular the Dirac algebra that is discussed below. These projection operators are also seen in density matrix theory where they are examples of pure density matrices.

More generally, the projection operator for spin in the (a, b, c) direction is given by

$$\frac{1}{2}\begin{bmatrix}1+c&a-ib\\a+ib&1-c\end{bmatrix}$$

and any non zero column can be taken as the projection operator. While the two columns appear different, one can use a^{2} + b^{2} + c^{2} = 1 to show that they are multiples (possibly zero) of the same spinor.

=== General remarks ===
In atomic physics and quantum mechanics, the property of spin plays a major role. In addition to their other properties all particles possess a non-classical property, i.e., which has no correspondence at all in conventional physics, namely the spin, which is a kind of intrinsic angular momentum. In the position representation, instead of a wavefunction without spin, ψ = ψ(r), one has with spin: ψ = ψ(r, σ), where σ takes the following discrete set of values:

$$\sigma =-S\cdot\hbar , -(S-1)\cdot\hbar , ... ,+(S-1)\cdot\hbar ,+S\cdot\hbar$$.

The total angular momentum operator, $\vec{\mathbb J}$, of a particle corresponds to the sum of the orbital angular momentum (i.e., there only integers are allowed) and the intrinsic part, the spin. One distinguishes bosons (S = 0, ±1, ±2, ...) and fermions (S = ±1/2, ±3/2, ±5/2, ...).

== See also ==
- Bloch sphere
- Pauli equation
