= Reflection symmetry =

Invariance under a mathematical reflection

Figures with the axes of symmetry drawn in. The figure with no axes is asymmetric.

In mathematics, reflection symmetry, line symmetry, mirror symmetry, or mirror-image symmetry is symmetry with respect to a reflection. That is, a figure which does not change upon undergoing a reflection has reflectional symmetry.

In two-dimensional space, there is a line/axis of symmetry, in three-dimensional space, there is a plane of symmetry. An object or figure which is indistinguishable from its transformed image is called mirror symmetric.

== Symmetric function ==
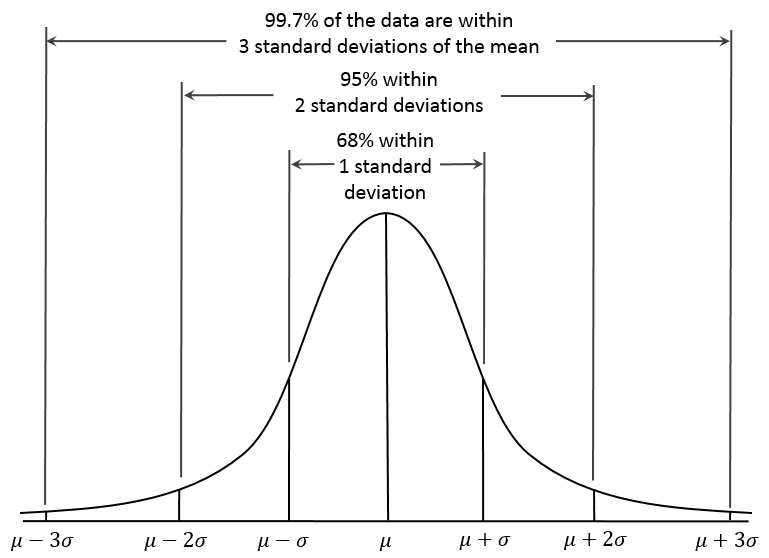
A normal distribution bell curve is an example of a symmetric function

In formal terms, a mathematical object is symmetric with respect to a given operation such as reflection, rotation, or translation, if, when applied to the object, this operation preserves some property of the object. The set of operations that preserve a given property of the object form a group. Two objects are symmetric to each other with respect to a given group of operations if one is obtained from the other by some of the operations (and vice versa).

The symmetric function of a two-dimensional figure is a line such that, for each perpendicular constructed, if the perpendicular intersects the figure at a distance 'd' from the axis along the perpendicular, then there exists another intersection of the shape and the perpendicular at the same distance 'd' from the axis, in the opposite direction along the perpendicular.

Another way to think about the symmetric function is that if the shape were to be folded in half over the axis, the two halves would be identical: the two halves are each other's mirror images. Thus, a square has four axes of symmetry because there are four different ways to fold it and have the edges all match. A circle has infinitely many axes of symmetry, while a cone and sphere have infinitely many planes of symmetry.

== Symmetric geometrical shapes ==
2D shapes w/reflective symmetry
isosceles trapezoid and kite
Hexagons
octagons

Triangles with reflection symmetry are isosceles. Quadrilaterals with reflection symmetry are kites, (concave) deltoids, rhombi, and isosceles trapezoids. All even-sided polygons have two simple reflective forms, one with lines of reflections through vertices, and one through edges. For an arbitrary shape, the axiality of the shape measures how close it is to being bilaterally symmetric. It equals 1 for shapes with reflection symmetry, and between two-thirds and 1 for any convex shape.

In 3D, the cube in which the plane can configure in all of the three axes that can reflect the cube has 9 planes of reflective symmetry.

== Advanced types of reflection symmetry ==
For more general types of reflection there are correspondingly more general types of reflection symmetry. For example:

- with respect to a non-isometric affine involution (an oblique reflection in a line, plane, etc.)
- with respect to circle inversion.

== In nature ==
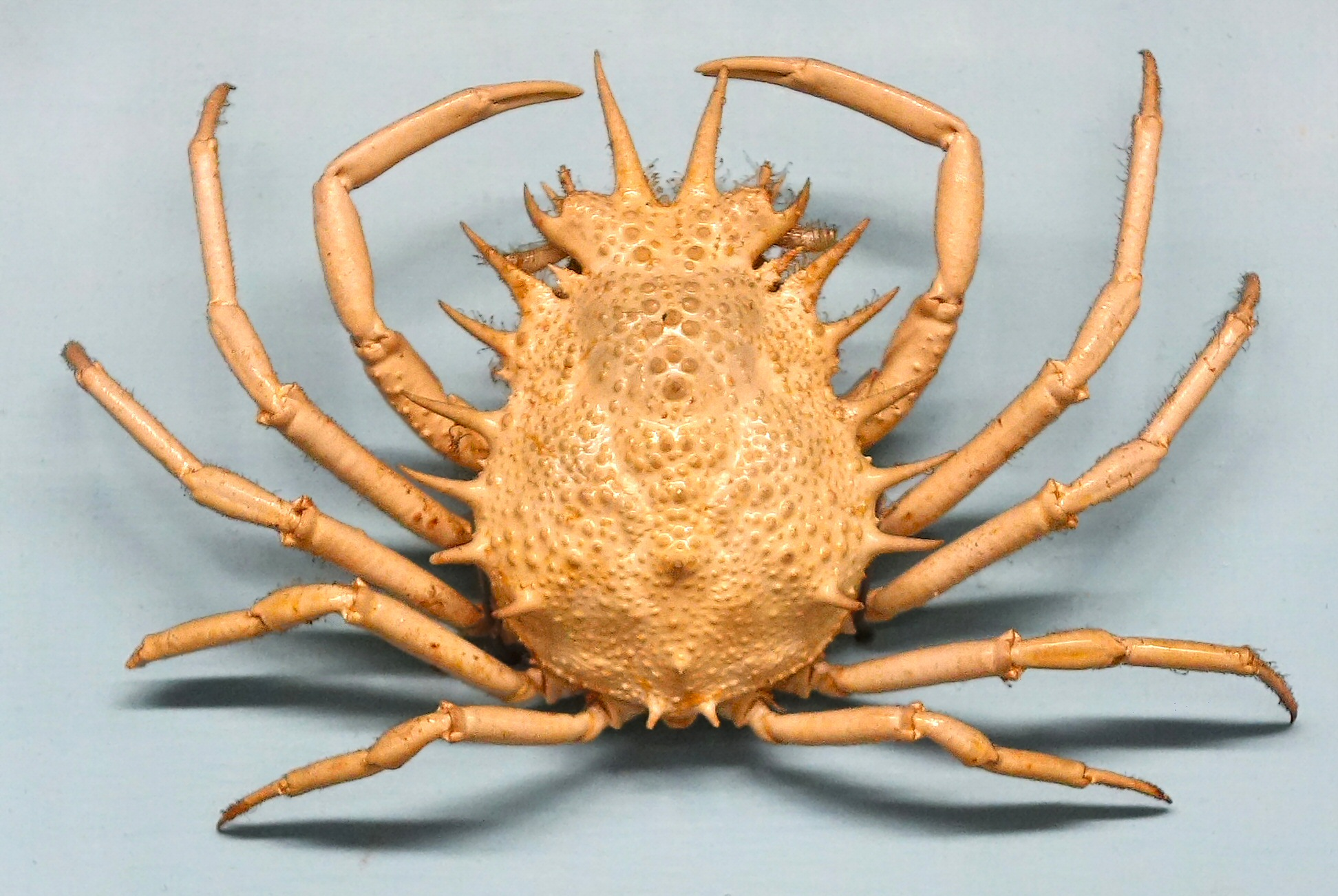
Many animals, such as this spider crab Maja crispata, are bilaterally symmetric.

Animals that are bilaterally symmetric have reflection symmetry around the sagittal plane, which divides the body vertically into left and right halves, with one of each sense organ and limb pair on either side. Most animals are bilaterally symmetric, likely because this supports forward movement and streamlining.

== In architecture ==
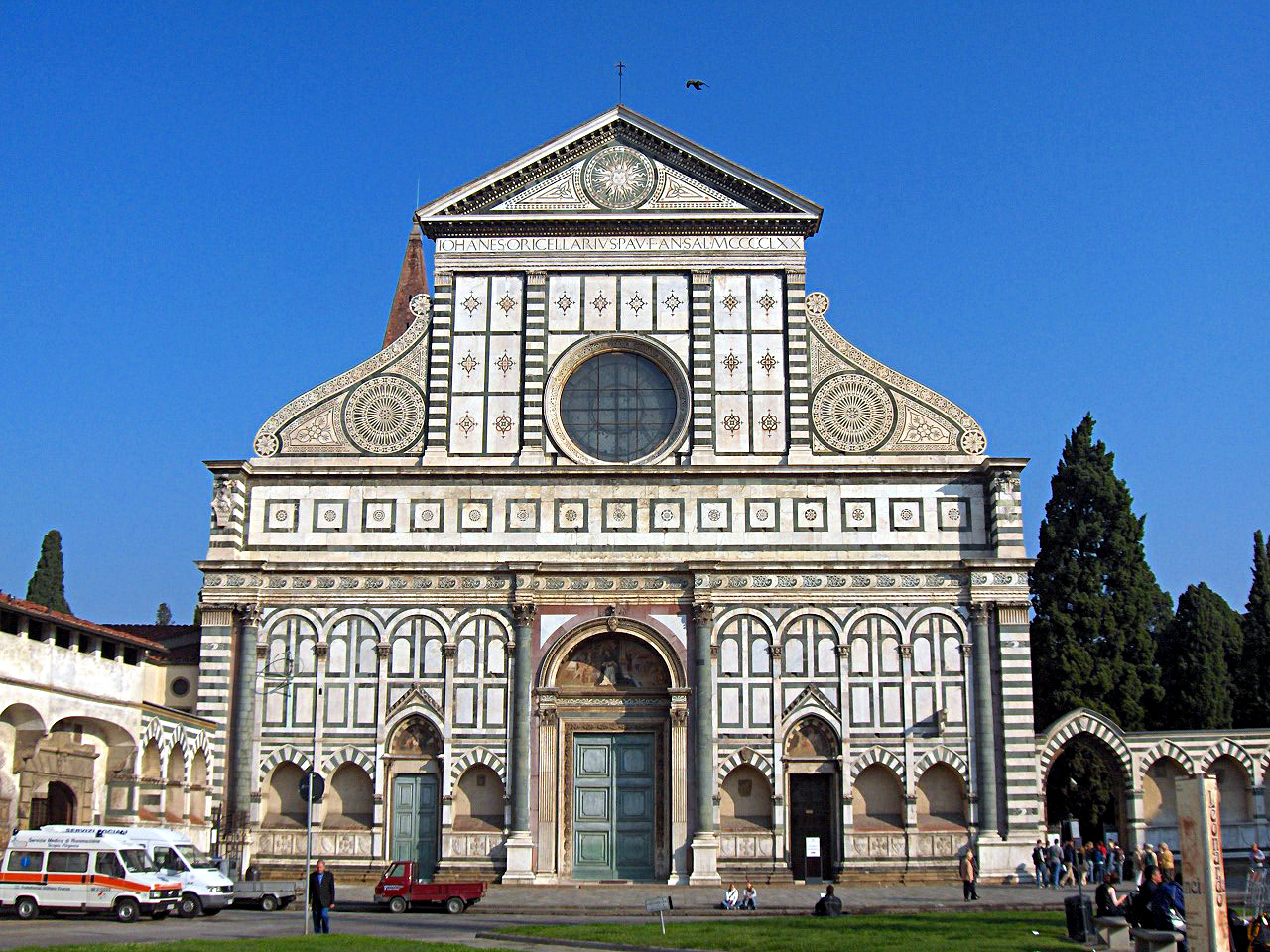
Mirror symmetry is often used in architecture, as in the facade of Santa Maria Novella, Florence, 1470.

Mirror symmetry is often used in architecture, as in the facade of Santa Maria Novella, Florence. It is also found in the design of ancient structures such as Stonehenge. Symmetry was a core element in some styles of architecture, such as Palladianism.

== See also ==
- Patterns in nature
- Point reflection symmetry
- Coxeter group theory about Reflection groups in Euclidean space
- Rotational symmetry (different type of symmetry)
- Chirality

== Bibliography ==
=== General ===
- Stewart, Ian (2001). What Shape is a Snowflake? Magical Numbers in Nature. Weidenfeld & Nicolson.

=== Advanced ===
- Weyl, Hermann (1982) [1952]. Symmetry. Princeton: Princeton University Press. ISBN 0-691-02374-3.
