= Scatter matrix =

Concept in probability theory

For the notion in quantum mechanics, see scattering matrix.

In multivariate statistics and probability theory, the scatter matrix is a statistic that is used to make estimates of the covariance matrix, for instance of the multivariate normal distribution.

== Definition ==
Given n samples of m-dimensional data, represented as the m-by-n matrix, $X=[\mathbf{x}_1,\mathbf{x}_2,\ldots,\mathbf{x}_n]$, the sample mean is

$$\overline{\mathbf{x}} = \frac{1}{n}\sum_{j=1}^n \mathbf{x}_j$$

where $\mathbf{x}_j$ is the j-th column of $X$.

The scatter matrix is the m-by-m positive semi-definite matrix

$$S = \sum_{j=1}^n (\mathbf{x}_j-\overline{\mathbf{x}})(\mathbf{x}_j-\overline{\mathbf{x}})^T = \sum_{j=1}^n (\mathbf{x}_j-\overline{\mathbf{x}})\otimes(\mathbf{x}_j-\overline{\mathbf{x}}) = \left( \sum_{j=1}^n \mathbf{x}_j \mathbf{x}_j^T \right) - n \overline{\mathbf{x}} \overline{\mathbf{x}}^T$$

where $(\cdot)^T$ denotes matrix transpose, and multiplication is with regards to the outer product. The scatter matrix may be expressed more succinctly as

$$S = X\,C_n\,X^T$$

where $\,C_n$ is the n-by-n centering matrix.

== Application ==
The maximum likelihood estimate, given n samples, for the covariance matrix of a multivariate normal distribution can be expressed as the normalized scatter matrix

$C_{ML}=\frac{1}{n}S.$

When the columns of $X$ are independently sampled from a multivariate normal distribution, then $S$ has a Wishart distribution.

== See also ==
- Estimation of covariance matrices
- Sample covariance matrix
- Wishart distribution
- Outer product—$XX^\top$or X⊗X is the outer product of X with itself.
- Gram matrix
