= Involutory matrix =

Square matrix which is its own inverse

In mathematics, an involutory matrix is a square matrix that is its own inverse. That is, multiplication by the matrix $\bold A_{n \times n}$ is an involution if and only if $\bold A^2 = \bold I,$ where $\bold I$ is the $n \times n$ identity matrix. Involutory matrices are all square roots of the identity matrix. This is a consequence of the fact that any invertible matrix multiplied by its inverse is the identity.

== Examples ==
The $2\times2$ real matrix
$$\begin{pmatrix}a & b \\ c & -a \end{pmatrix}$$
is involutory provided that $a^2 + bc = 1 .$

The Pauli matrices in $M(2,\C)$ are involutory:
$$\begin{align}
\sigma_1 = \sigma_x &=
\begin{pmatrix}
0 & 1 \\
1 & 0
\end{pmatrix}, \\
\sigma_2 = \sigma_y &=
\begin{pmatrix}
0 & -i \\
i & 0
\end{pmatrix}, \\
\sigma_3 = \sigma_z &=
\begin{pmatrix}
1 & 0 \\
0 & -1
\end{pmatrix}.
\end{align}$$

One of the three classes of elementary matrix is involutory, namely the row-interchange elementary matrix. A special case of another class of elementary matrix, that which represents multiplication of a row or column by −1, is also involutory; it is in fact a trivial example of a signature matrix, all of which are involutory.

Some simple examples of involutory matrices are shown below.

$$\begin{array}{cc}
\mathbf{I} = \begin{pmatrix}
1 & 0 & 0 \\
0 & 1 & 0 \\
0 & 0 & 1
\end{pmatrix}
; &
\mathbf{I}^{-1} = \begin{pmatrix}
1 & 0 & 0 \\
0 & 1 & 0 \\
0 & 0 & 1
\end{pmatrix}
\\
\\
\mathbf{R} = \begin{pmatrix}
1 & 0 & 0 \\
0 & 0 & 1 \\
0 & 1 & 0
\end{pmatrix}
; &
\mathbf{R}^{-1} = \begin{pmatrix}
1 & 0 & 0 \\
0 & 0 & 1 \\
0 & 1 & 0
\end{pmatrix}
\\
\\
\mathbf{S} = \begin{pmatrix}
+1 & 0 & 0 \\
0 & -1 & 0 \\
0 & 0 & -1
\end{pmatrix}
; &
\mathbf{S}^{-1} = \begin{pmatrix}
+1 & 0 & 0 \\
0 & -1 & 0 \\
0 & 0 & -1
\end{pmatrix}
\\
\end{array}$$
where

- I is the 3 × 3 identity matrix (which is trivially involutory);
- R is the 3 × 3 identity matrix with a pair of interchanged rows;
- S is a signature matrix.

Any block-diagonal matrices constructed from involutory matrices will also be involutory, as a consequence of the linear independence of the blocks.

== Symmetry ==
An involutory matrix which is also symmetric is an orthogonal matrix, and thus represents an isometry (a linear transformation which preserves Euclidean distance). Conversely every orthogonal involutory matrix is symmetric. As a special case of this, every reflection and 180° rotation matrix is involutory.

== Properties ==
An involution is non-defective, and each eigenvalue equals $\pm 1$, so an involution diagonalizes to a signature matrix.

A normal involution is Hermitian (complex) or symmetric (real) and also unitary (complex) or orthogonal (real).

The determinant of an involutory matrix over any field is ±1.

If A is an n × n matrix, then A is involutory if and only if $\bold P_+ = (\bold I + \bold A)/2$ is idempotent. This relation gives a bijection between involutory matrices and idempotent matrices. Similarly, A is involutory if and only if $\bold P_- = (\bold I - \bold A)/2$ is idempotent. These two operators form the symmetric and antisymmetric projections $v_\pm = \bold P_\pm v$ of a vector $v = v_+ + v_-$ with respect to the involution A, in the sense that $\bold Av_\pm = \pm v_\pm$, or $\bold{A P}_\pm = \pm \bold P_\pm$. The same construct applies to any involutory function, such as the complex conjugate (real and imaginary parts), transpose (symmetric and antisymmetric matrices), and Hermitian adjoint (Hermitian and skew-Hermitian matrices).

If A is an involutory matrix in $M(n, \R),$ which is a matrix algebra over the real numbers, and A is not a scalar multiple of I, then the subalgebra $\{x \bold I + y \bold A: x y \in \R\}$ generated by A is isomorphic to the split-complex numbers.

If A and B are two involutory matrices which commute with each other (i.e. AB = BA) then AB is also involutory.

If A is an involutory matrix then every integer power of A is involutory. In fact, A^{n} will be equal to A if n is odd and I if n is even.

== See also ==
- Affine involution
