= Signature matrix =

Diagonal matrix whose elements are plus or minus 1

In mathematics, a signature matrix is a diagonal matrix whose diagonal elements are either 1 or -1, that is, any matrix of the form

$$A=\begin{pmatrix}
\pm 1   & 0       & \cdots & 0       & 0      \\
0       & \pm 1   & \cdots & 0       & 0      \\
\vdots  & \vdots  & \ddots & \vdots  & \vdots \\
0       & 0       & \cdots & \pm 1   & 0      \\
0       & 0       & \cdots & 0       & \pm 1
\end{pmatrix}.$$

== Properties ==
Any signature matrix is its own inverse and hence is an involutory matrix. It is consequently a square root of the identity matrix.

Since signature matrices are both symmetric and involutory, they are orthogonal. Consequently, any linear transformation corresponding to a signature matrix constitutes an isometry. Geometrically, signature matrices represent a reflection in each of the axes corresponding to the negated rows or columns.

If $A$ is an $n \times n$ signature matrix, then:

- The determinant of $A$ is either 1 or -1 (since it is diagonal), and
- $-n \leq \operatorname{tr}(A)\leq n$ (since the diagonal values are either -1 or 1).

== See also ==
- Metric signature
- Signature (matrix)
