= Oblique reflection =

Non-perpendicular Euclidean reflection

Oblique reflection examples

In Euclidean geometry, oblique reflections generalize ordinary reflections by not requiring that reflection be done using perpendiculars. If two points are oblique reflections of each other, they will still stay so under affine transformations.

Consider a plane P in the three-dimensional Euclidean space. The usual reflection of a point A in space in respect to the plane P is another point B in space, such that the midpoint of the segment AB is in the plane, and AB is perpendicular to the plane. For an oblique reflection, one requires instead of perpendicularity that AB be parallel to a given reference line.

Formally, let there be a plane P in the three-dimensional space, and a line L in space not parallel to P. To obtain the oblique reflection of a point A in space in respect to the plane P, one draws through A a line parallel to L, and lets the oblique reflection of A be the point B on that line on the other side of the plane such that the midpoint of AB is in P. If the reference line L is perpendicular to the plane, one obtains the usual reflection.

For example, consider the plane P to be the xy plane, that is, the plane given by the equation z=0 in Cartesian coordinates. Let the direction of the reference line L be given by the vector (a, b, c), with c≠0 (that is, L is not parallel to P). The oblique reflection of a point (x, y, z) will then be

$$\left(x-\frac{2za}{c}, y-\frac{2zb}{c}, -z\right).$$

The concept of oblique reflection is easily generalizable to oblique reflection in respect to an affine hyperplane in R^{n} with a line again serving as a reference, or even more generally, oblique reflection in respect to a k-dimensional affine subspace, with a n−k-dimensional affine subspace serving as a reference. Back to three dimensions, one can then define oblique reflection in respect to a line, with a plane serving as a reference.

An oblique reflection is an affine transformation, and it is an involution, meaning that the reflection of the reflection of a point is the point itself.
