= Mittag-Leffler polynomials =

Mathematical functions

In mathematics, the Mittag-Leffler polynomials are the polynomials g_{n}(x) or M_{n}(x) studied by Mittag-Leffler (1891).

M_{n}(x) is a special case of the Meixner polynomial M_{n}(x;b,c) at b = 0, c = -1.

== Definition and examples ==
=== Generating functions ===
The Mittag-Leffler polynomials are defined respectively by the generating functions

$\displaystyle \sum_{n=0}^{\infty} g_n(x)t^n :=\frac{1}{2}\Bigl(\frac{1+t}{1-t} \Bigr)^x$ and
$$\displaystyle \sum_{n=0}^{\infty} M_n(x)\frac{t^n}{n!}:=\Bigl(\frac{1+t}{1-t} \Bigr)^x=(1+t)^x(1-t)^{-x}=\exp(2x\text{ artanh } t).$$

They also have the bivariate generating function

$$\displaystyle \sum_{n=1}^{\infty}\sum_{m=1}^{\infty} g_n(m)x^my^n =\frac{xy}{(1-x)(1-x-y-xy)}.$$

=== Examples ===
The first few polynomials are given in the following table. The coefficients of the numerators of the $g_n(x)$ can be found in the OEIS, though without any references, and the coefficients of the $M_n(x)$ are in the OEIS as well.

n	g_{n}(x)	M_{n}(x)
0	$\frac{1}{2}$	$1$
1	$x$	$2x$
2	$x^2$	$4x^2$
3	${\frac{1}{3}} (x+2x^3)$	$8x^3+4x$
4	${\frac{1}{3}} (2x^2+x^4)$	$16x^4+32x^2$
5	${\frac{1}{15}} (3x+10x^3+2x^5)$	$32 x^5 + 160 x^3 + 48 x$
6	${\frac{1}{45}} (23x^2+20x^4+2x^6)$	$64 x^6 + 640 x^4 + 736 x^2$
7	${\frac{1}{315}} (45 x + 196 x^3 + 70 x^5 + 4 x^7)$	$128 x^7 + 2240 x^5 + 6272 x^3 + 1440 x$
8	${\frac{1}{315}} (132 x^2 + 154 x^4 + 28 x^6 + x^8)$	$256 x^8 + 7168 x^6 + 39424 x^4 + 33792 x^2$
9	${\frac{1}{2835}} (315 x + 1636 x^3 + 798 x^5 + 84 x^7 + 2 x^9)$	$512 x^9 + 21504 x^7 + 204288 x^5 + 418816 x^3 + 80640 x$
10	${\frac{1}{14175}} (5067 x^2 + 7180 x^4 + 1806 x^6 + 120 x^8 + 2 x^{10})$	$1024 x^{10} + 61440 x^8 + 924672 x^6 + 3676160 x^4 + 2594304 x^2$

== Properties ==
The polynomials are related by $M_n(x)=2\cdot{n!} \, g_n(x)$ and we have $g_n(1)=1$ for $n\geqslant 1$. Also $g_{2k}(\frac12)=g_{2k+1}(\frac12)=\frac12\frac{(2k-1)!!}{(2k)!!}=\frac12\cdot \frac{1\cdot 3\cdots (2k-1) }{2\cdot 4\cdots (2k)}$.

=== Explicit formulas ===
Explicit formulas are

$$g_n(x) = \sum_ {k = 1}^{n} 2^{k-1}\binom{n-1}{n-k}\binom xk = \sum_ {k = 0}^{n-1} 2^{k}\binom{n-1}{k}\binom x{k+1}$$
$$g_n(x)  = \sum_{k = 0}^{n-1} \binom{n-1}k\binom{k+x}n$$
$$g_n(m) = \frac12\sum_{k = 0}^m \binom mk\binom{n-1+m-k}{m-1}=\frac12\sum_{k = 0}^{\min(n,m)} \frac m{n+m-k}\binom{n+m-k}{k,n-k,m-k}$$

(the last one immediately shows $ng_n(m)=mg_m(n)$, a kind of reflection formula), and

$M_n(x)=(n-1)!\sum_ {k = 1}^{n}k2^k\binom nk \binom xk$, which can be also written as
$M_n(x)=\sum_ {k = 1}^{n}2^k\binom nk(n-1)_{n-k}(x)_k$, where $(x)_n = n!\binom xn = x(x-1)\cdots(x-n+1)$ denotes the falling factorial.

In terms of the Gaussian hypergeometric function, we have

$$g_n(x) = x\!\cdot {}_2\!F_1 (1-n,1-x; 2; 2).$$

=== Reflection formula ===
As stated above, for $m,n\in\mathbb N$, we have the reflection formula $ng_n(m)=mg_m(n)$.

=== Recursion formulas ===
The polynomials $M_n(x)$ can be defined recursively by

$M_n(x)=2xM_{n-1}(x)+(n-1)(n-2)M_{n-2}(x)$, starting with $M_{-1}(x)=0$ and $M_{0}(x)=1$.

Another recursion formula, which produces an odd one from the preceding even ones and vice versa, is

$M_{n+1}(x) = 2x \sum_{k=0}^{\lfloor n/2 \rfloor} \frac{n!}{(n-2k)!} M_{n-2k}(x)$, again starting with $M_0(x) = 1$.

As for the $g_n(x)$, we have several different recursion formulas:

$$\displaystyle (1)\quad g_n(x + 1) - g_{n-1}(x + 1)= g_n(x) + g_{n-1}(x)$$

$$\displaystyle (2)\quad (n + 1)g_{n+1}(x) - (n - 1)g_{n-1}(x) = 2xg_n(x)$$

$$(3)\quad x\Bigl(g_n(x+1)-g_n(x-1)\Bigr) = 2ng_n(x)$$

$$(4)\quad g_{n+1}(m)= g_{n}(m)+2\sum_{k=1}^{m-1}g_{n}(k)=g_{n}(1)+g_{n}(2)+\cdots+g_{n}(m)+g_{n}(m-1) +\cdots+g_{n}(1)$$

Concerning recursion formula (3), the polynomial $g_n(x)$ is the unique polynomial solution of the difference equation $x(f(x+1)-f(x-1)) = 2nf(x)$, normalized so that $f(1) = 1$. Further note that (2) and (3) are dual to each other in the sense that for $x\in\mathbb N$, we can apply the reflection formula to one of the identities and then swap $x$ and $n$ to obtain the other one. (As the $g_n(x)$ are polynomials, the validity extends from natural to all real values of $x$.)

=== Initial values ===
The table of the initial values of $g_n(m)$ (these values are also called the "figurate numbers for the n-dimensional cross polytopes" in the OEIS) may illustrate the recursion formula (1), which can be taken to mean that each entry is the sum of the three neighboring entries: to its left, above and above left, e.g. $g_5(3)=51=33+8+10$. It also illustrates the reflection formula $ng_n(m)=mg_m(n)$ with respect to the main diagonal, e.g. $3\cdot44=4\cdot33$.

n m	1	2	3	4	5	6	7	8	9	10
1	1	1	1	1	1	1	1	1	1	1
2	2	4	6	8	10	12	14	16	18	
3	3	9	19	33	51	73	99	129		
4	4	16	44	96	180	304	476			
5	5	25	85	225	501	985				
6	6	36	146	456	1182					
7	7	49	231	833						
8	8	64	344							
9	9	81								
10	10									

=== Orthogonality relations ===
For $m,n\in\mathbb N$ the following orthogonality relation holds:

$$\int_{-\infty}^{\infty}\frac{g_n(-iy)g_m(iy)}{y \sinh \pi y} dy=\frac 1{2n}\delta_{mn}.$$

(Note that this is not a complex integral. As each $g_n$ is an even or an odd polynomial, the imaginary arguments just produce alternating signs for their coefficients. Moreover, if $m$ and $n$ have different parity, the integral vanishes trivially. This has been one of the reasons to introduce the § Reduced Mittag-Leffler polynomials.)

=== Binomial identity ===
Being a Sheffer sequence of binomial type, the Mittag-Leffler polynomials $M_n(x)$ also satisfy the binomial identity

$$M_n(x+y)=\sum_{k=0}^n\binom nk M_k(x)M_{n-k}(y)$$.

=== Rodrigues-type formula ===
The classical Mittag–Leffler polynomials $g_n(x)$ satisfy a Rodrigues' formula involving the central difference operator. This formula can be derived using their connection to the Meixner–Pollaczek polynomials.

The classical Mittag–Leffler polynomials $g_n(x)$ are given by the Rodrigues-type formula

$$g_n(x) = \frac{2^n n!}{x \, w(x,1)} \, \delta^n \Bigl[ w(x,n) \Bigr]$$,

where $\delta$ is the central difference operator defined by

$$\delta f(z) = f\left(z + \frac{1}{2}\right) - f\left(z - \frac{1}{2}\right)$$

and higher powers $\delta^n$ are obtained by successive application. The weight-like function is the Gamma ratio

$$w(x,n) = \frac{\Gamma\left(n + \frac{1}{2} - x\right)}{\Gamma\left(n + \frac{1}{2} + x\right)}$$.

This representation is obtained from the relation of $g_n(x)$ to the Meixner–Pollaczek polynomials $P_n^{(1)}(ix; \pi/2)$ and the known Rodrigues formula for the latter family.

=== Integral representations ===
Based on the representation as a hypergeometric function, there are several ways of representing $g_n(z)$ for $|z|<1$ directly as integrals, some of them being even valid for complex $z$, e.g.

$$(26)\qquad g_n(z) = \frac{\sin(\pi z)}{2\pi}\int _{-1}^1  t^{n-1} \Bigl(\frac{1+t}{1-t}\Bigr)^z dt$$

$$(27)\qquad g_n(z) = \frac{\sin(\pi z)}{2\pi} \int_{-\infty}^{\infty} e^{uz}\frac{(\tanh \frac u2)^n}{\sinh u} du$$

$$(32)\qquad g_n(z) = \frac1\pi\int _0^\pi  \cot^z (\frac u2) \cos (\frac{\pi z}2) \cos (nu)du$$

$$(33)\qquad g_n(z) = \frac1\pi\int _0^\pi  \cot^z (\frac u2) \sin (\frac{\pi z}2) \sin (nu)du$$

$$(34)\qquad g_n(z) = \frac1{2\pi}\int _0^{2\pi} (1+e^{it})^z (2+e^{it})^{n-1} e^{-int}dt$$.

=== Closed forms of integral families ===
There are several families of integrals with closed-form expressions in terms of zeta values where the coefficients of the Mittag-Leffler polynomials occur as coefficients. All those integrals can be written in a form containing either a factor $\tan^{\pm n}$ or $\tanh^{\pm n}$, which is closely linked to the fact that the generating function features $\text{artanh}$. The degree of the Mittag-Leffler polynomial varies with $n$. One way to work out those integrals is to obtain for them the corresponding recursion formulas as for the Mittag-Leffler polynomials using integration by parts.

1. For instance, define for $n\geqslant m \geqslant 2$

$$I(n,m):= \int _0^1\dfrac{\text{artanh}^nx}{x^m}dx
= \int _0^1\log^{n/2}\Bigl(\dfrac{1+x }{1-x}\Bigr)\dfrac{dx}{x^m}
= \int _0^\infty z^n\dfrac{ \coth^{m-2}z }{\sinh^2z} dz.$$

These integrals have the closed form

$$(1)\quad I(n,m)=\frac{n!}{2^{n-1}}\zeta^{n+1}~g_ {m-1}(\frac1{\zeta} )$$

in umbral notation, meaning that after expanding the polynomial in $\zeta$, each power $\zeta^k$ has to be replaced by the zeta value $\zeta(k)$. E.g. from $g_6(x)={\frac{1}{45}} (23x^2+20x^4+2x^6)\$ we get $\ I(n,7)=\frac{n!}{2^{n-1}}\frac{23~\zeta(n-1)+20~\zeta(n-3)+2~\zeta(n-5)}{45}\$ for $n\geqslant 7$.

2. Likewise take for $n\geqslant m \geqslant 2$

$$J(n,m):=\int _1^\infty\dfrac{\text{arcoth}^nx}{x^m}dx =\int _1^\infty\log^{n/2}\Bigl(\dfrac{x+1}{x-1}\Bigr)\dfrac{dx}{x^m}
= \int _0^\infty z^n\dfrac{\tanh^{m-2}z }{\cosh^2z} dz.$$

In umbral notation, where after expanding, $\eta^k$ has to be replaced by the Dirichlet eta function $\eta(k):=\left(1-2^{1-k}\right)\zeta(k)$, those have the closed form

$$(2)\quad J(n,m)=\frac{n!}{2^{n-1}}  \eta^{n+1}~g_ {m-1}(\frac1{\eta} )$$.

3. The following holds for $n\geqslant m$ with the same umbral notation for $\zeta$ and $\eta$, and completing by continuity $\eta(1):=\ln 2$.

$$(3)\quad \int\limits_0^{\pi/2} \frac{x^n}{\tan^m x}dx =    \cos\Bigl(\frac{ m}{2}\pi\Bigr)\frac{(\pi/2)^{n+1}}{n+1}
+\cos\Bigl(\frac{ m-n-1}{2}\pi\Bigr) \frac{n!~m}{2^{n}}\zeta^{n+2}g_m(\frac1{\zeta})
+\sum\limits_{v=0}^n  \cos\Bigl(\frac{  m-v-1}{2}\pi\Bigr)\frac{n!~m~\pi^{n-v}}{(n-v)!~2^{n}} \eta^{n+2}g_m(\frac1{\eta}).$$

Note that for $n\geqslant m \geqslant 2$, this also yields a closed form for the integrals

$$\int\limits_0^{\infty} \frac{\arctan^n x}{x^m} dx = \int\limits_0^{\pi/2} \frac{x^n}{\tan^m x} dx + \int\limits_0^{\pi/2} \frac{x^n}{\tan^{m-2} x} dx.$$

4. For $n\geqslant m\geqslant 2$, define $\quad K(n,m):=\int\limits_0^\infty\dfrac{\tanh^n(x)}{x^m}dx$.

If $n+m$ is even and we define $h_k:= (-1)^{\frac{k-1}2} \frac{(k-1)!(2^k-1)\zeta(k)}{2^{k-1}\pi^{k-1}}$, we have in umbral notation, i.e. replacing $h^k$ by $h_k$,

$$(4)\quad K(n,m):=\int\limits_0^\infty\dfrac{\tanh^n(x)}{x^m}dx =
\dfrac{n\cdot 2^{m-1}}{ (m-1)!}(-h)^{m-1} g_n(h).$$

Note that only odd zeta values (odd $k$) occur here (unless the denominators are cast as even zeta values), e.g.

$$K(5,3)=-\frac{2}{3}(3h_3+10h_5+2h_7)=-7\frac{\zeta(3)}{\pi^2}+ 310 \frac{\zeta(5)}{\pi^4} -1905\frac{\zeta(7)}{\pi^6},$$
$$K(6,2)=\frac{4}{15}(23h_3+20h_5+2h_7),\quad K(6,4)=\frac{4}{45}(23h_5+20h_7+2h_9).$$

5. If $n+m$ is odd, the same integral is much more involved to evaluate, including the initial one $\int\limits_0^\infty\dfrac{\tanh^3(x)}{x^2}dx$. Yet it turns out that the pattern subsists if we define $s_k:=\eta'(-k)=2^{k+1}\zeta(-k)\ln2-(2^{k+1}-1)\zeta'(-k)$, equivalently $s_k = \frac{\zeta(-k)}{\zeta'(-k)}\eta(-k)+\zeta(-k)\eta(1)-\eta(-k)\eta(1)$. Then $K(n,m)$ has the following closed form in umbral notation, replacing $s^k$ by $s_k$:

$(5)\quad K(n,m)=\int\limits_0^\infty\dfrac{\tanh^n(x)}{x^m}dx=\frac{n\cdot2^{m}}{(m-1)!}(-s)^{m-2}g_n(s)$, e.g.
$$K(5,4)=\frac{8}{9}(3s_3+10s_5+2s_7), \quad K(6,3)=-\frac{8}{15}(23s_3+20s_5+2s_7),\quad K(6,5)=-\frac{8}{45}(23s_5+20s_7+2s_9).$$

Note that by virtue of the logarithmic derivative $\frac{\zeta'}{\zeta}(s)+\frac{\zeta'}{\zeta}(1-s)=\log\pi-\frac{1}{2}\frac{\Gamma'}{\Gamma}\left(\frac{s}{2}\right)-\frac{1}{2}\frac{\Gamma'}{\Gamma}\left(\frac{1-s}{2}\right)$ of Riemann's functional equation, taken after applying Euler's reflection formula, these expressions in terms of the $s_k$ can be written in terms of $\frac{\zeta'(2j) }{\zeta(2j) }$, e.g.

$$K(5,4)=\frac{8}{9}(3s_3+10s_5+2s_7)=\frac 19\left\{ \frac{1643}{420}-\frac{16 }{315}\ln2+3\frac{\zeta'(4) }{\zeta(4) }-20\frac{\zeta'(6) }{\zeta(6) }+17\frac{\zeta'(8) }{\zeta(8) }\right\}.$$

6. For $n<m$, the same integral $K(n,m)$ diverges because the integrand behaves like $x^{n-m}$ for $x\searrow 0$. But the difference of two such integrals with corresponding degree differences is well-defined and exhibits very similar patterns, e.g.

$$(6)\quad K(n-1,n)-K(n,n+1)=\int\limits_0^\infty\left(\dfrac{\tanh^{n-1}(x)}{x^{n}}-\dfrac{\tanh^{n}(x)}{x^{n+1}}\right)dx= -\frac 1n + \frac{ (n+1)\cdot2^{n}}{(n-1)!}s^{n-2}g_n(s)$$.

7. For $n\ge m\ge1$, define

$$L(n,m):=\int_0^1\frac{x^n}{\operatorname{artanh}^m x}\,dx.$$

If $n+m$ is even, let

$$\omega_j:=\frac{(2^{2j-1}-1)\zeta(2j-1)}{\pi^{2j-2}},$$

and write

$$\nu:=(n+1)\bmod2\in\{0,1\}.$$

Then

$$L(n,m)=
\sum_{k=1}^{(n+m)/2}
(-1)^{k-1+\lfloor m/2\rfloor}
\frac{(2k+m-1-\nu)!}
{2^{\,2k-1-\nu}(m-1)!}
[x^{2k-\nu}]g_{n+1}(x)\,
\omega_{k+\lceil m/2\rceil}.$$

Here $[x^p]g_{n+1}(x)$ denotes the coefficient of $x^p$ in the Mittag-Leffler polynomial $g_{n+1}$. When $n$ is odd ($\nu=0$), only even coefficients of $g_{n+1}$ contribute; when $n$ is even ($\nu=1$), only odd coefficients contribute. Consequently, the expansion involves only odd Riemann zeta values. Equivalently, it is a linear combination of derivatives of the Riemann zeta function at negative even integers.

Examples with $n=4$ (even, $\nu=1$), using $g_5(x)=\tfrac1{15}(3x+10x^3+2x^5)$:

$$L(4,2)
=
\frac1{15}
(-6\omega_2+60\omega_3-90\omega_4)
=
-\frac{2\cdot7\,\zeta(3)}{5\pi^2}
+\frac{4\cdot31\,\zeta(5)}{\pi^4}
-\frac{6\cdot127\,\zeta(7)}{\pi^6},$$

$$L(4,4)
=
\frac1{15}
(12\omega_3-300\omega_4+840\omega_5)
=
\frac{4\cdot31\,\zeta(5)}{5\pi^4}
-\frac{20\cdot127\,\zeta(7)}{\pi^6}
+\frac{56\cdot511\,\zeta(9)}{\pi^8}.$$

Examples with $n=5$ (odd, $\nu=0$), using $g_6(x)=\tfrac1{45}(23x^2+20x^4+2x^6)$:

$$L(5,1)
=
\frac1{45}
(23\omega_2-60\omega_3+45\omega_4)
=
\frac{23\cdot7\,\zeta(3)}{45\pi^2}
-\frac{4\cdot31\,\zeta(5)}{3\pi^4}
+\frac{127\,\zeta(7)}{\pi^6},$$

$$L(5,3)
=
\frac1{15}
(-46\omega_3+300\omega_4-420\omega_5)
=
-\frac{46\cdot31\,\zeta(5)}{15\pi^4}
+\frac{20\cdot127\,\zeta(7)}{\pi^6}
-\frac{28\cdot511\,\zeta(9)}{\pi^8},$$

$$L(5,5)
=
\frac1{15}
(115\omega_4-1400\omega_5+3150\omega_6)
=
\frac{23\cdot127\,\zeta(7)}{3\pi^6}
-\frac{280\cdot511\,\zeta(9)}{3\pi^8}
+\frac{210\cdot2047\,\zeta(11)}{\pi^{10}}.$$

8. For $n+m$ odd, $n > m\geq 1$, the same integrals

$$L(n,m)=\int_0^1\frac{x^n}{\operatorname{artanh}^m x} dx$$

involve derivatives of the Riemann zeta function at negative odd integers. Let again

$$\nu:=(n+1)\bmod2\in\{0,1\}.$$

Then we have the closed form

$$L(n,m)=\lambda(n,m)\ln2+(-1)^m\sum_{j=1}^{\lfloor(n+m)/2\rfloor+1}C(j,m)\,[x^{2j-\nu}]g_{n+1}(x)\,\zeta'\bigl(1-2j-2\lfloor m/2\rfloor\bigr),$$

where $[x^p]g_{n+1}(x)$ denotes the coefficient of $x^p$ in the Mittag-Leffler polynomial $g_{n+1}$, and $C(j,m)$ is given explicitly by

$$C(j,m)=\frac{2^{m+1}}{(m-1)!}\left(4^{j+\lfloor m/2\rfloor}-1\right).$$

The last term in the sum, corresponding to $j=\lfloor(n+m)/2\rfloor+1$, vanishes identically whenever $m\ge2$, since then $2j-\nu>\deg g_{n+1}=n+1$; it thus contributes only when $m=1$, where it lands exactly at the top degree of $g_{n+1}$.

The coefficient of $\ln2$ has the closed form

$$\lambda(n,m)=[t^{n+m+1}]\left(\frac{t}{\operatorname{artanh}t}\right)^{m}
=-\frac{m}{n+1}\,[s^{n+m+1}]\bigl(s\coth s\bigr)^{n+1},$$

where the second expression follows by Lagrange inversion from $t=\tanh s$. Writing $B_k^{(r)}$ for the higher-order (Nørlund) Bernoulli numbers defined by

$$\left(\frac{x}{e^x-1}\right)^{r}=\sum_{k\ge0}B_k^{(r)}\,\frac{x^k}{k!},$$

this expands into the finite closed-form sum

$$\lambda(n,m)=-\frac{m}{n+1}\sum_{i=0}^{n+1}\binom{n+1}{i}\,2^{n+m+1-i}\,\frac{B_{n+m+1-i}^{(n+1-i)}}{(n+m+1-i)!}.$$

Examples with $g_3(x)=\tfrac13(x+2x^3)$ and $g_6(x)=\tfrac1{45}(23x^2+20x^4+2x^6)$:

$$L(2,1)=\int_0^1\frac{x^2}{\operatorname{artanh}x}\,dx=-4\zeta'(-1)-40\zeta'(-3)-\frac{4}{45}\ln2,$$
$$L(5,2)=\frac{184}{3}\zeta'(-3)+224\,\zeta'(-5)+\frac{272}{3}\zeta'(-7)-\frac{304}{14175}\ln2,$$
$$L(5,4)=\frac{2576}{15}\zeta'(-5)+\frac{5440}{9}\zeta'(-7)+\frac{10912}{45}\zeta'(-9)+\frac{256}{93555}\ln2.$$

For reference,

$$C(1,m)=12,\,
120,\,
120,\,
336,\,
168,\,
\frac{272}{3},\,
\frac{272}{9},\,
\frac{272}{21},\,
\frac{136}{21},\,
\frac{18176}{315},\,
\frac{18176}{1575},\,
\frac{2912}{693},\,
\frac{5824}{8316},\,
\frac{87376}{2027025}$$

for $m=1,\dots,14$.

== Reduced Mittag-Leffler polynomials ==
The reduced Mittag-Leffler polynomials are a family of real polynomials derived from the classical Mittag-Leffler polynomials $g_n(x)$ by means of an imaginary-argument transformation. This yields real-valued polynomials that are orthogonal on the real line with respect to a hyperbolic weight function, in contrast to the classical version which uses orthogonality on the imaginary axis. The reduced form and its properties (including finite- and infinite-order differential equations) were studied in detail by Rajković et al. (2024).

=== Definition ===
The reduced Mittag-Leffler polynomials $\phi_n(x)$ for $n \in \mathbb{N}_0$ are defined as

$$\phi_n(x) = \frac{g_{n+1}(ix)}{i^{n+1} x}$$.

where $g_n(x)$ are the classical Mittag-Leffler polynomials satisfying the generating function

$$\left( \frac{1+t}{1-t} \right)^x = \sum_{n=0}^\infty g_n(x) t^n \quad (|t| < 1)$$,

with initial conditions $g_0(x) = 1$ and $g_1(x) = 2x$. They obey the three-term recurrence relation

$$(n+2) \phi_{n+1}(x) = 2x \phi_n(x) - n \phi_{n-1}(x) \quad (n \in \mathbb{N})$$,

with initial values

$$\phi_0(x) = 2, \phi_1(x) = 2x$$.

The polynomials satisfy the parity relation

$$\phi_n(-x) = (-1)^n \phi_n(x)$$.

The associated monic reduced Mittag-Leffler polynomials are given by

$$\hat{\phi}_n(x) = \frac{(n+1)!}{2^{n+1}} \phi_n(x)$$,

which satisfy the monic recurrence

$$\hat{\phi}_{n+1}(x) = x \hat{\phi}_n(x) - \frac{n(n+1)}{4} \hat{\phi}_{n-1}(x) \quad (n \in \mathbb{N})$$,

with $\hat{\phi}_0(x) = 1$ and $\hat{\phi}_1(x) = x$.

=== Explicit low-degree terms ===
The first few monic reduced polynomials are:

- $\hat{\phi}_0(x) = 1$
- $\hat{\phi}_1(x) = x$
- $\hat{\phi}_2(x) = x^2 - \frac{1}{2}$
- $\hat{\phi}_3(x) = x^3 - 2x$
- $\hat{\phi}_4(x) = x^4 - 5x^2 + \frac{3}{2}$
- $\hat{\phi}_5(x) = x^5 - 10x^3 + \frac{23}{2} x$

=== Orthogonality relation ===
The reduced Mittag-Leffler polynomials $\{\phi_n(x)\}_{n \in \mathbb{N}_0}$ are orthogonal on the real line with weight function $\frac{x}{\sinh(\pi x)}$:

$$\int_{-\infty}^{\infty} \phi_n(x) \phi_m(x) \frac{x}{\sinh(\pi x)} \, dx = \frac{2}{n+1} \delta_{mn} \quad (n,m \in \mathbb{N}_0)$$.

All zeros of $\phi_n(x)$ (and hence of $\hat{\phi}_n(x)$) are real.

=== Differential equations ===
Every monic reduced polynomial $\hat{\phi}_n(x)$ satisfies a finite-order ordinary differential equation of order $n$:

$$\sum_{k=1}^{n} (\alpha_k + \beta_k x) \frac{\hat{\phi}_n^{(k)}(x)}{k!} - n \hat{\phi}_n(x) = 0$$,

where the coefficients are

$$\alpha_k = \cos \frac{k \pi}{2}, \quad \beta_k = \sin \frac{k \pi}{2}$$.

For example, for $n=4$, we have $\hat{\phi}_4(x) = x^4 - 5x^2 + \frac{3}{2}$. The coefficients are:

$$\alpha_1 = 0, \beta_1 = 1; \quad \alpha_2 = -1, \beta_2 = 0; \quad \alpha_3 = 0, \beta_3 = -1; \quad \alpha_4 = 1, \beta_4 = 0$$.

The differential equation becomes:

$$x \hat{\phi}_4'(x) - \frac{1}{2}\hat{\phi}_4''(x) - \frac{x}{6}\hat{\phi}_4'''(x) + \frac{1}{24}\hat{\phi}_4^{(4)}(x) - 4\hat{\phi}_4(x) = 0$$.

This can be verified by computing the derivatives: $\hat{\phi}_4'(x) = 4x^3 - 10x$, $\hat{\phi}_4''(x) = 12x^2 - 10$, $\hat{\phi}_4'''(x) = 24x$, $\hat{\phi}_4^{(4)}(x) = 24$, and substituting into the equation.

Additionally, they satisfy the infinite-order (operator) differential equation

$$(\cos D + x \sin D - (n+1) I) \hat{\phi}_n(x) = 0 \quad \left( D = \frac{d}{dx},\ I = \text{identity operator} \right)$$,

meaning $\hat{\phi}_n(x)$ is an eigenfunction of the operator $\cos D + x \sin D - I$ with eigenvalue $n$.

The operators $\sin D$ and $\cos D$ act on functions via their Taylor series. For example, for $\hat{\phi}_4(x) = x^4 - 5x^2 + \frac{3}{2}$:

$$\cos D \, \hat{\phi}_4(x) = \hat{\phi}_4(x) - \frac{1}{2!}\hat{\phi}_4''(x) + \frac{1}{4!}\hat{\phi}_4^{(4)}(x) = x^4 - 5x^2 + \frac{3}{2} - \frac{1}{2}(12x^2 - 10) + \frac{1}{24}(24) = x^4 - 11x^2 + 9$$,
$$\sin D \, \hat{\phi}_4(x) = \hat{\phi}_4'(x) - \frac{1}{3!}\hat{\phi}_4'''(x) = 4x^3 - 10x - \frac{1}{6}(24x) = 4x^3 - 14x$$,
$$x \sin D \, \hat{\phi}_4(x) = x(4x^3 - 14x) = 4x^4 - 14x^2$$.

Thus:

$$(\cos D + x \sin D - 5I)\hat{\phi}_4(x) = (x^4 - 11x^2 + 9) + (4x^4 - 14x^2) - 5(x^4 - 5x^2 + \frac{3}{2}) = 0$$,

confirming that $\hat{\phi}_4$ is an eigenfunction with eigenvalue $n = 4$.

These differential properties arise because $\{\hat{\phi}_n(x)\}$ form a Sheffer sequence with exponential generating function

$$\hat{G}(t,x) = \frac{4 \exp\left(2x \arctan(t/2)\right)}{t^2 + 4} = \sum_{n=0}^\infty \hat{\phi}_n(x) \frac{t^n}{n!}$$,

together with the theory of Sheffer sequences.

== See also ==
- Bernoulli polynomials of the second kind
- Stirling polynomials
- Poly-Bernoulli number
