= Stirling polynomials =

In mathematics, the Stirling polynomials are a family of polynomials that generalize important sequences of numbers appearing in combinatorics and analysis, which are closely related to the Stirling numbers, the Bernoulli numbers, and the generalized Bernoulli polynomials. There are multiple variants of the Stirling polynomial sequence considered below most notably including the Sheffer sequence form of the sequence, $S_k(x)$, defined characteristically through the special form of its exponential generating function, and the Stirling (convolution) polynomials, $\sigma_n(x)$, which also satisfy a characteristic ordinary generating function and that are of use in generalizing the Stirling numbers (of both kinds) to arbitrary complex-valued inputs. We consider the "convolution polynomial" variant of this sequence and its properties second in the last subsection of the article. Still other variants of the Stirling polynomials are studied in the supplementary links to the articles given in the references.

== Definition and examples ==
For nonnegative integers k, the Stirling polynomials, S_{k}(x), are a Sheffer sequence for $(g(t), \bar{f}(t)) := \left(e^{-t}, \log\left(\frac{t}{1-e^{-t}}\right)\right)$ defined by the exponential generating function

$$\left( {t \over {1-e^{-t}}} \right) ^{x+1}= \sum_{k=0}^\infty S_k(x){t^k \over k!}.$$

The Stirling polynomials are a special case of the Nørlund polynomials (or generalized Bernoulli polynomials) each with exponential generating function

$$\left( {t \over {e^t-1}} \right) ^a e^{z t}= \sum_{k=0}^\infty B^{(a)}_k(z){t^k \over k!},$$

given by the relation $S_k(x)= B_k^{(x+1)}(x+1)$.

The first 10 Stirling polynomials are given in the following table:

k	S_{k}(x)
0	$1$
1	${\scriptstyle\frac{1}{2}}(x+1)$
2	${\scriptstyle\frac{1}{12}} (3x^2+5x+2)$
3	${\scriptstyle\frac{1}{8}} (x^3+2x^2+x)$
4	${\scriptstyle\frac{1}{240}} (15x^4+30x^3+5x^2-18x-8)$
5	${\scriptstyle\frac{1}{96}} (3x^5+5x^4-5x^3-13x^2-6x)$
6	${\scriptstyle\frac{1}{4032}} (63x^6+63x^5-315x^4-539x^3-84x^2+236x+96)$
7	${\scriptstyle\frac{1}{1152}} (9x^7-84x^5-98x^4+91x^3+194x^2+80x)$
8	${\scriptstyle\frac{1}{34560}} (135x^8-180x^7-1890x^6-840x^5+6055x^4+8140x^3+884x^2-3088x-1152)$
9	${\scriptstyle\frac{1}{7680}} (15x^9-45x^8-270x^7+182x^6+1687x^5+1395x^4-1576x^3-2684x^2-1008x)$

Yet another variant of the Stirling polynomials is considered in (see also the subsection on Stirling convolution polynomials below). In particular, the article by I. Gessel and R. P. Stanley defines the modified Stirling polynomial sequences, $f_k(n) := S(n+k, n)$ and $g_k(n) := c(n, n-k)$ where $c(n, k) := (-1)^{n-k} s(n, k)$ are the unsigned Stirling numbers of the first kind, in terms of the two Stirling number triangles for non-negative integers $n \geq 1,\ k \geq 0$. For fixed $k \geq 0$, both $f_k(n)$ and $g_k(n)$ are polynomials of the input $n \in \mathbb{Z}^{+}$ each of degree $2k$ and with leading coefficient given by the double factorial term $(1 \cdot 3 \cdot 5 \cdots (2k-1)) / (2k)!$.

== Properties ==
Below $B_k(x)$ denote the Bernoulli polynomials and $B_k = B_k(0)$ the Bernoulli numbers under the convention $B_1 = B_1(0) = -\tfrac{1}{2};$ $s_{m,n}$ denotes a Stirling number of the first kind; and $S_{m,n}$ denotes Stirling numbers of the second kind.

- Special values:
  $$\begin{align}
S_k(-m) &= \frac{(-1)^k}{{k+m-1 \choose k}} S_{k+m-1,m-1} && 0 < m \in \Z\\[6pt]
S_k(-1) &= \delta_{k,0} \\[6pt]
S_k(0)  &= (-1)^k B_k \\[6pt]
S_k(1)  &= (-1)^{k+1} ((k-1) B_k+ k B_{k-1}) \\[6pt]
S_k(2)  &= \tfrac{(-1)^k}{2} ((k-1)(k-2) B_k+ 3 k(k-2) B_{k-1}+ 2 k(k-1) B_{k-2}) \\[6pt]
S_k(k)  &= k! \\[6pt]
\end{align}$$
- If $m \in \N$ and $m < k$ then:
  $$S_k(m) = {(m+1)}\binom k{m+1} \sum_{j=0}^m(-1)^{m-j} s_{m+1, m+1-j} \frac{B_{k-j}}{k-j}.$$
- If $m \in \N$ and $m \geq k$ then:
  $$S_k(m) = (-1)^k B_k^{(m+1)}(0),$$
  and:
  $$S_k(m)= {(-1)^k \over {m \choose k}} s_{m+1, m+1-k}.$$
- The sequence $S_k(x-1)$ is of binomial type, since
  $$S_k(x+y-1)= \sum_{i=0}^k {k \choose i} S_i(x-1) S_{k-i}(y-1).$$
  Moreover, this basic recursion holds:
  $$S_k(x)= (x-k) {S_k(x-1) \over x} + k S_{k-1}(x+1).$$
- Explicit representations involving Stirling numbers can be deduced with Lagrange's interpolation formula:
  $$\begin{align}
S_k(x)&= \sum_{n=0}^k (-1)^{k-n} S_{k+n,n} {{x+n \choose n} {x+k+1 \choose k-n} \over {k+n \choose n}} \\[6pt]
&= \sum_{n=0}^k (-1)^n s_{k+n+1,n+1} {{x-k \choose n} {x-k-n-1 \choose k-n} \over {k+n \choose k}}\\[6pt]
&= k! \sum_{j=0}^k (-1)^{k-j}\sum_{m=j}^k {x+m\choose m}{m\choose j}L_{k+m}^{(-k-j)}(-j) \\[6pt]
\end{align}$$
  Here, $L_n^{(\alpha)}$ are Laguerre polynomials.
- The following relations hold as well:
  $${k+m \choose k} S_k(x-m)= \sum_{i=0}^k (-1)^{k-i} {k+m \choose i} S_{k-i+m,m} \cdot S_i(x),$$
  $${k-m \choose k} S_k(x+m)= \sum_{i=0}^k {k-m \choose i} s_{m,m-k+i} \cdot S_i(x).$$
- By differentiating the generating function it readily follows that
  $$S_k^\prime(x) = -\sum_{j=0}^{k-1} {k \choose j} S_j(x) \frac{B_{k-j}}{k-j}.$$

== Stirling convolution polynomials ==
=== Definition and examples ===
Another variant of the Stirling polynomial sequence corresponds to a special case of the convolution polynomials studied by Knuth's article and in the Concrete Mathematics reference. We first define these polynomials through the Stirling numbers of the first kind as

$$\sigma_n(x) = \left[\begin{matrix} x \\ x-n \end{matrix} \right] \cdot \frac{1}{x(x-1)\cdots(x-n)}.$$

It follows that these polynomials satisfy the next recurrence relation given by

$$(x+1) \sigma_n(x+1) = (x-n) \sigma_n(x) + x \sigma_{n-1}(x),\ n \geq 1.$$

These Stirling "convolution" polynomials may be used to define the Stirling numbers,
$$\scriptstyle{\left[\begin{matrix} x \\ x-n \end{matrix} \right]}$$
and
$$\scriptstyle{\left\{\begin{matrix} x \\ x-n \end{matrix} \right\}}$$
, for integers $n \geq 0$ and arbitrary complex values of $x$. The next table provides several special cases of these Stirling polynomials for the first few $n \geq 0$.

n	σ_{n}(x)
0	$\frac{1}{x}$
1	$\frac{1}{2}$
2	$\frac1{24} (3 x - 1)$
3	$\frac1{48} (x^2 - x)$
4	$\frac1{5760} (15 x^3 - 30 x^2 + 5 x + 2)$
5	$\frac1{11520} (3 x^4 - 10 x^3 + 5 x^2 + 2 x)$
6	$\frac1{2903040} (63 x^5 - 315 x^4 + 315 x^3 + 91 x^2 - 42 x - 16)$
7	$\frac1{5806080} (9 x^6 - 63 x^5 + 105 x^4 + 7 x^3 - 42 x^2 - 16 x)$
8	$\frac1{1393459200} (135 x^7 - 1260 x^6 + 3150 x^5 - 840 x^4 - 2345 x^3 - 540 x^2 + 404 x + 144)$
9	$\frac1{2786918400} (15 x^8 - 180 x^7 + 630 x^6 - 448 x^5 - 665 x^4 + 100 x^3 + 404 x^2 + 144 x)$
10	$\frac1{367873228800} (99 x^9 - 1485 x^8 + 6930 x^7 - 8778 x^6 - 8085 x^5 + 8195 x^4 + 11792 x^3 + 2068 x^2 - 2288 x - 768)$

=== Generating functions ===
This variant of the Stirling polynomial sequence has particularly nice ordinary generating functions of the following forms:

$$\begin{align}
\left(\frac{z e^z}{e^z-1}\right)^x & = \sum_{n \geq 0} x \sigma_n(x) z^n \\
\left(\frac{1}{z} \ln \frac{1}{1-z}\right)^x & = \sum_{n \geq 0} x \sigma_n(x+n) z^n.
\end{align}$$

More generally, if $\mathcal{S}_t(z)$ is a power series that satisfies $\ln\left(1-z \mathcal{S}_t(z)^{t-1}\right) = -z \mathcal{S}_t(z)^t$, we have that

$$\mathcal{S}_t(z)^x = \sum_{n \geq 0} x \sigma_n(x+tn) z^n.$$

We also have the related series identity

$$\sum_{n \geq 0} (-1)^{n-1} \sigma_n(n-1) z^n = \frac{z}{\ln(1+z)} = 1 +\frac{z}{2} - \frac{z^2}{12} + \cdots,$$

and the Stirling (Sheffer) polynomial related generating functions given by

$$\sum_{n \geq 0} (-1)^{n+1} m \cdot \sigma_n(n-m) z^n = \left(\frac{z}{\ln(1+z)}\right)^m$$

$$\sum_{n \geq 0} (-1)^{n+1} m \cdot \sigma_n(m) z^n = \left(\frac{z}{1-e^{-z}}\right)^m.$$

=== Properties and relations ===
For integers $0 \leq k \leq n$ and $r, s \in \mathbb{C}$, these polynomials satisfy the two Stirling convolution formulas given by

$$(r+s) \sigma_n(r+s+tn) = rs \sum_{k=0}^n \sigma_k(r+tk) \sigma_{n-k}(s+t(n-k))$$

and

$$n \sigma_n(r+s+tn) = s \sum_{k=0}^n k \sigma_k(r+tk) \sigma_{n-k}(s+t(n-k)).$$

When $n, m \in \mathbb{N}$, we also have that the polynomials, $\sigma_n(m)$, are defined through their relations to the Stirling numbers

$$\begin{align}
\left\{\begin{matrix} n \\ m \end{matrix} \right\} & = (-1)^{n-m+1} \frac{n!}{(m-1)!} \sigma_{n-m}(-m)\ (\text{when } m < 0) \\
\left[\begin{matrix} n \\ m \end{matrix} \right] & = \frac{n!}{(m-1)!} \sigma_{n-m}(n)\ (\text{when } m > n),
\end{align}$$

and their relations to the Bernoulli numbers given by

$$\begin{align}
\sigma_n(m) & = \frac{(-1)^{m+n-1}}{m! (n-m)!} \sum_{0 \leq k < m} \left[\begin{matrix} m \\ m-k \end{matrix} \right] \frac{B_{n-k}}{n-k},\ n \geq m > 0 \\
\sigma_n(m) & = -\frac{B_n}{n \cdot n!},\ m = 0.
\end{align}$$

== See also ==
- Bernoulli polynomials
- Bernoulli polynomials of the second kind
- Sheffer and Appell sequences
- Difference polynomials
- Special polynomial generating functions
- Gregory coefficients
