= Bernoulli polynomials of the second kind =

Polynomial sequence

The Bernoulli polynomials of the second kind ψ_{n}(x), also known as the Fontana–Bessel polynomials, are the polynomials defined by the following generating function:
$$\frac{z(1+z)^x}{\ln(1+z)}= \sum_{n=0}^\infty z^n \psi_n(x) ,\qquad |z|<1.$$

The first five polynomials are:
$$\begin{align}
\psi_0(x) &=                                                           1  \\[2mm]
\psi_1(x) &=                                                       x + \frac{1}{2} \\[2mm]
\psi_2(x) &=                                      \frac{1}{2} x^2    - \frac{1}{12} \\[2mm]
\psi_3(x) &=                    \frac{1}{6} x^3 - \frac{1}{4} x^2    + \frac{1}{24} \\[2mm]
\psi_4(x) &= \frac{1}{24} x^4 - \frac{1}{6} x^3 + \frac{1}{6} x^2    - \frac{19}{720}
\end{align}$$

Some authors define these polynomials slightly differently
$$\frac{z \left(1+z\right)^x}{\ln(1+z)} = \sum_{n=0}^\infty \frac{z^n}{n!} \psi^*_n(x) ,\qquad |z|<1,$$
so that $\psi^*_n(x) = \psi_n(x) \, n!$ and may also use a different notation for them (the most used alternative notation is b_{n}(x)). Under this convention, the polynomials form a Sheffer sequence.

The Bernoulli polynomials of the second kind were largely studied by the Hungarian mathematician Charles Jordan, but their history may also be traced back to much earlier works.

== Integral representations ==
The Bernoulli polynomials of the second kind may be represented via these integrals
$$\psi_{n}(x) = \int_x^{x+1}\! \binom{u}{n} \, du = \int_0^1 \binom{x+u}{n} \, du$$
as well as
$$\begin{align}
\psi_{n}(x) &= \frac{\left(-1\right)^{n+1}}{\pi}
\int_0^\infty  \frac{\pi \cos\pi x - \sin\pi x \ln z}{(1+z)^n} \cdot\frac{z^x  dz}{\ln^2 z +\pi^2}
,\qquad  -1\leq x\leq n-1\, \\[3mm]
\psi_{n}(x) &= \frac{\left(-1\right)^{n+1}}{\pi}
\int_{-\infty}^{+\infty} \frac{\pi \cos\pi x - v\sin\pi x }{\left(1+e^v\right)^n} \cdot \frac{e^{v(x+1)} }{v^2 +\pi^2}\, dv ,\qquad  -1\leq x\leq n-1\,
\end{align}$$

These polynomials are, therefore, up to a constant, the antiderivative of the binomial coefficient and also that of the falling factorial.

== Explicit formula ==
For an arbitrary n, these polynomials may be computed explicitly via the following summation formula
$$\psi_{n}(x) = \frac{1}{(n-1)!}\sum_{l=0}^{n-1} \frac{s(n-1,l)}{l+1} x^{l+1} + G_{n}, \qquad n=1,2,3,\ldots$$
where s(n,l) are the signed Stirling numbers of the first kind and G_{n} are the Gregory coefficients.

The expansion of the Bernoulli polynomials of the second kind into a Newton series reads
$$\psi_{n}(x) = G_0 \binom{x}{n} + G_1 \binom{x}{n-1} + G_2 \binom{x}{n-2} + \ldots + G_n$$
It can be shown using the second integral representation and Vandermonde's identity.

== Recurrence formula ==
The Bernoulli polynomials of the second kind satisfy the recurrence relation
$$\psi_{n}(x+1) - \psi_{n}(x) = \psi_{n-1}(x)$$
or equivalently
$$\Delta\psi_{n}(x) = \psi_{n-1}(x)$$

The repeated difference produces
$$\Delta^m\psi_{n}(x) = \psi_{n-m}(x)$$

== Symmetry property ==
The main property of the symmetry reads
$$\psi_{n}{\left(\tfrac{1}{2}n-1+x\right)} = \left(-1\right)^n \psi_{n}{\left(\tfrac{1}{2}n-1-x\right)}$$

== Some further properties and particular values ==
Some properties and particular values of these polynomials include
$$\begin{align}
&\psi_n(0) = G_n  \\[2mm]
&\psi_n(1) = G_{n-1} + G_{n} \\[2mm]
&\psi_n(-1) = \left(-1\right)^{n+1} \sum_{m=0}^n \left|G_m\right| = \left(-1\right)^n C_n\\[2mm]
&\psi_n(n-2) = - \left|G_n\right|  \\[2mm]
&\psi_n(n-1) = \left(-1\right)^n \psi_n(-1) = 1 - \sum_{m=1}^n \left|G_m\right| \\[2mm]
&\psi_{2n}(n-1) = M_{2n} \\[2mm]
&\psi_{2n}(n-1+y) = \psi_{2n}(n-1-y) \\[2mm]
&\psi_{2n+1}(n-\tfrac{1}{2}+y) = -\psi_{2n+1}(n-\tfrac{1}{2}-y) \\[2mm]
&\psi_{2n+1}(n-\tfrac{1}{2}) = 0
\end{align}$$
where C_{n} are the Cauchy numbers of the second kind and M_{n} are the central difference coefficients.

== Some series involving the Bernoulli polynomials of the second kind ==
The digamma function Ψ(x) may be expanded into a series with the Bernoulli polynomials of the second kind in the following way
$$\Psi(v) = \ln(v+a) + \sum_{n=1}^\infty \frac{(-1)^n\psi_{n}(a)\,(n-1)!}{(v)_{n}},\qquad \Re(v) > -a,$$
and hence
$$\gamma= -\ln(a+1) - \sum_{n=1}^\infty\frac{(-1)^n \psi_{n}(a)}{n},\qquad \Re(a)>-1$$
and
$$\gamma = \sum_{n=1}^\infty \frac{(-1)^{n+1}}{2n}\left\{\psi_{n}(a)+ \psi_{n}\left(-\frac{a}{1+a}\right)\right\},
\quad a>-1$$
where γ is Euler's constant. Furthermore, we also have
$$\Psi(v) = \frac{1}{v + a - \frac{1}{2}} \left\{\ln\Gamma(v+a) + v - \frac{1}{2}\ln(2\pi) - \frac{1}{2} + \sum_{n=1}^\infty \frac{\left(-1\right)^n \psi_{n+1}(a)}{(v)_{n}} \left(n-1\right)!\right\}, \quad \Re(v)>-a,$$
where Γ(x) is the gamma function. The Hurwitz and Riemann zeta functions may be expanded into these polynomials as follows
$$\zeta(s,v) = \frac{(v+a)^{1-s} }{s-1} +  \sum_{n=0}^\infty (-1)^n \psi_{n+1}(a)
\sum_{k=0}^{n} \left(-1\right)^k \binom{n}{k} (k+v)^{-s}$$
and
$$\zeta(s)= \frac{(a+1)^{1-s} }{s-1} +  \sum_{n=0}^\infty (-1)^n \psi_{n+1}(a)
\sum_{k=0}^{n} \left(-1\right)^k \binom{n}{k} (k+1)^{-s}$$
and also
$$\zeta(s) = 1 + \frac{(a+2)^{1-s}}{s-1} +  \sum_{n=0}^\infty (-1)^n \psi_{n+1}(a)
\sum_{k=0}^{n} \left(-1\right)^k \binom{n}{k} (k+2)^{-s}$$

The Bernoulli polynomials of the second kind are also involved in the following relationship
$$\big(v+a-\tfrac{1}{2}\big)\zeta(s,v) = -\frac{\zeta(s-1,v+a)}{s-1} + \zeta(s-1,v) +
\sum_{n=0}^\infty \left(-1\right)^n \psi_{n+2}(a) \sum_{k=0}^{n} \left(-1\right)^k \binom{n}{k} (k+v)^{-s}$$
between the zeta functions, as well as in various formulas for the Stieltjes constants, e.g.
$$\gamma_m(v) = -\frac{\ln^{m+1}(v+a)}{m+1} + \sum_{n=0}^\infty (-1)^n \psi_{n+1}(a)
\sum_{k=0}^{n} \left(-1\right)^k \binom{n}{k}\frac{\ln^m (k+v)}{k+v}$$
and
$$\gamma_m(v)=\frac{1}{\tfrac{1}{2}-v-a}
\left\{\frac{(-1)^m}{m+1}\,\zeta^{(m+1)}(0,v+a)- (-1)^m \zeta^{(m)}(0,v)
- \sum_{n=0}^\infty (-1)^n \psi_{n+2}(a)
\sum_{k=0}^{n} (-1)^k \binom{n}{k}\frac{\ln^m (k+v)}{k+v}\right\}$$
which are both valid for $\Re(a) > -1$ and $v \in \mathbb{C}\setminus\!\{0,-1,-2,\ldots\}$.

== See also ==
- Bernoulli polynomials
- Stirling polynomials
- Gregory coefficients
- Bernoulli numbers
- Difference polynomials
- Poly-Bernoulli number
- Mittag-Leffler polynomials
