= Gregory coefficients =

Rational numbers in a reciprocal logarithm

Gregory coefficients G_{n}, also known as reciprocal logarithmic numbers, Bernoulli numbers of the second kind, or Cauchy numbers of the first kind, are the rational numbers that occur in the Maclaurin series expansion of the reciprocal logarithm

$$\begin{align}
\frac{z}{\ln(1+z)} & = 1+\frac12 z - \frac{1}{12}z^2 + \frac{1}{24}z^3 - \frac{19}{720}z^4 + \frac{3}{160}z^5 - \frac{863}{60480}z^6 + \cdots \\
& = 1 + \sum_{n=1}^\infty G_n z^n\,,\qquad |z|<1\,.
\end{align}$$

Gregory coefficients are alternating G_{n} = (−1)^{n−1}|G_{n}| for n > 0 and decreasing in absolute value. These numbers are named after James Gregory who introduced them in 1670 in the numerical integration context. They were subsequently rediscovered by many mathematicians and often appear in works of modern authors, who do not always recognize them.

== Numerical values ==
| n | 1 | 2 | 3 | 4 | 5 | 6 | 7 | 8 | 9 | 10 | 11 | ... | OEIS sequences |
|---|---|---|---|---|---|---|---|---|---|---|---|---|---|
| G_{n} | +1/2 | −1/12 | +1/24 | −19/720 | +3/160 | −863/60480 | +275/24192 | −33953/3628800 | +8183/1036800 | −3250433/479001600 | +4671/788480 | ... | OEIS: A002206 (numerators), OEIS: A002207 (denominators) |

== Computation and representations ==
The simplest way to compute Gregory coefficients is to use the recurrence formula

$$|G_n| = -\sum_{k=1}^{n-1} \frac{|G_k|}{n+1-k} + \frac 1 {n+1}$$

with G_{1} = 1/2. Gregory coefficients may be also computed explicitly via the following differential

$$n! G_n=\left[\frac{\textrm d^n}{\textrm dz^n}\frac{z}{\ln(1+z)}\right]_{z=0},$$

or the integral

$$G_n=\frac 1 {n!} \int_0^1 x(x-1)(x-2)\cdots(x-n+1)\, dx = \int_0^1 \binom x n \, dx,$$

which can be proved by integrating $(1+z)^x$ between 0 and 1 with respect to $x$, once directly and the second time using the binomial series expansion first.

It implies the finite summation formula

$$n! G_n= \sum_{\ell=0}^n \frac{s(n,\ell)}{\ell+1} ,$$

where s(n,ℓ) are the signed Stirling numbers of the first kind.

and Schröder's integral formula

$$G_n=(-1)^{n-1} \int_0^\infty \frac{dx}{(1+x)^n(\ln^2 x + \pi^2)},$$

== Bounds and asymptotic behavior ==
The Gregory coefficients satisfy the bounds

$$\frac{1}{6n(n-1)}<\big|G_n\big|<\frac{1}{6n},\qquad n>2,$$

given by Johan Steffensen. These bounds were later improved by various authors. The best known bounds for them were given by Blagouchine. In particular,

$$\frac{\,1\,}{\,n\ln^2\! n\,} \,-\, \frac{\,2\,}{\,n\ln^3\! n\,}
\leqslant\,\big|G_n\big|\, \leqslant\, \frac{\,1\,}{\,n\ln^2\! n\,} - \frac{\,2\gamma \,
}{\,n\ln^3\! n\,} \,,
\qquad\quad n\geqslant5\,.$$

Asymptotically, at large index n, these numbers behave as

$$\big|G_n\big|\sim \frac{1}{n\ln^2 n}, \qquad n\to\infty.$$

More accurate description of G_{n} at large n may be found in works of Van Veen, Davis, Coffey, Nemes and Blagouchine.

== Series with Gregory coefficients ==
Series involving Gregory coefficients may be often calculated in a closed-form. Basic series with these numbers include

$$\begin{align}
&\sum_{n=1}^\infty\big|G_n\big|=1 \\[2mm]
&\sum_{n=1}^\infty G_n=\frac{1}{\ln2} -1 \\[2mm]
&\sum_{n=1}^\infty \frac{\big|G_n\big|}{n}=\gamma,
\end{align}$$

where γ = 0.5772156649... is Euler's constant. These results are very old, and their history may be traced back to the works of Gregorio Fontana and Lorenzo Mascheroni. More complicated series with the Gregory coefficients were calculated by various authors. Kowalenko, Alabdulmohsin and some other authors calculated

$$\begin{array}{l}
\displaystyle
\sum_{n=2}^\infty \frac{\big|G_n\big|}{n-1}= -\frac{1}{2} + \frac{\ln2\pi}{2} -\frac{\gamma}{2}  \\[6mm]
\displaystyle
\displaystyle\sum_{n=1}^{\infty}\!\frac{\big|G_n\big|}{n+1}= 1- \ln2.
\end{array}$$

Alabdulmohsin also gives these identities with

$$\begin{align}
& \sum_{n=0}^\infty (-1)^n (\big|G_{3n+1}\big| + \big|G_{3n+2}\big|) = \frac{\sqrt{3}}{\pi} \\[2mm]
& \sum_{n=0}^\infty (-1)^n (\big|G_{3n+2}\big| + \big|G_{3n+3}\big|) =  \frac{2\sqrt{3}}{\pi} - 1 \\[2mm]
& \sum_{n=0}^\infty (-1)^n (\big|G_{3n+3}\big| + \big|G_{3n+4}\big|) = \frac{1}{2}- \frac{\sqrt{3}}{\pi}.
\end{align}$$

Candelperger, Coppo and Young showed that

$$\sum_{n=1}^\infty \frac{\big|G_n\big|\cdot H_n}{n}=\frac{\pi^2}{6}-1,$$

where H_{n} are the harmonic numbers. Blagouchine provides the following identities

$$\begin{align}
& \sum_{n=1}^\infty
\frac{G_n}{n} =\operatorname{li}(2)-\gamma \\[2mm]
& \sum_{n=3}^\infty \frac{\big|G_n\big|}{n-2} =
-\frac{1}{8} + \frac{\ln2\pi}{12} - \frac{\zeta'(2)}{\,2\pi^2}\\[2mm]
& \sum_{n=4}^\infty \frac{\big|G_n\big|}{n-3} =
-\frac{1}{16} + \frac{\ln2\pi}{24} - \frac{\zeta'(2)}{4\pi^2} + \frac{\zeta(3)}{8\pi^2}\\[2mm]
& \sum_{n=1}^\infty \frac{\big|G_n\big|}{n+2} =\frac{1}{2}-2\ln2 +\ln3  \\[2mm]
& \sum_{n=1}^\infty \frac{\big|G_n\big|}{n+3} =\frac{1}{3}-5\ln2+3\ln3  \\[2mm]
& \sum_{n=1}^\infty \frac{\big|G_n\big|}{n+k}
=\frac{1}{k}+\sum_{m=1}^k (-1)^m \binom{k}{m}\ln(m+1) \,, \qquad k=1, 2, 3,\ldots\\[2mm]
& \sum_{n=1}^\infty
\frac{\big|G_n\big|}{n^2} =\int_0^1 \frac{-\operatorname{li}(1-x)+\gamma+\ln x} x \, dx \\[2mm]
& \sum_{n=1}^\infty
\frac{G_n}{n^2} =\int_0^1\frac{\operatorname{li}(1+x)-\gamma-\ln x}{x}\, dx,
\end{align}$$

where li(z) is the integral logarithm and $\tbinom{k}{m}$ is the binomial coefficient. It is also known that the zeta function, the gamma function, the polygamma functions, the Stieltjes constants and many other special functions and constants may be expressed in terms of infinite series containing these numbers.

== Generalizations ==
Various generalizations are possible for the Gregory coefficients. Many of them may be obtained by modifying the parent generating equation. For example, Van Veen considered

$$\left(\frac{\ln(1+z)}{z}\right)^s= s\sum_{n=0}^\infty \frac{z^n}{n!}K^{(s)}_n \,,\qquad |z|<1\,,$$

and hence

$$n!G_n=-K_n^{(-1)}$$

Equivalent generalizations were later proposed by Kowalenko and Rubinstein. In a similar manner, Gregory coefficients are related to the generalized Bernoulli numbers

$$\left(\frac{t}{e^t-1}\right)^s= \sum_{k=0}^\infty \frac{t^k}{k!} B^{(s)}_k , \qquad |t|<2\pi\,,$$

see, so that

$$n!G_n=-\frac{B_n^{(n-1)}}{n-1}$$

Jordan defines polynomials ψ_{n}(s) such that

$$\frac{z(1+z)^s}{\ln(1+z)}= \sum_{n=0}^\infty z^n \psi_n(s) \,,\qquad |z|<1\,,$$

and call them Bernoulli polynomials of the second kind. From the above, it is clear that G_{n} = ψ_{n}(0). Carlitz generalized Jordan's polynomials ψ_{n}(s) by introducing polynomials β

$$\left(\frac{z}{\ln(1+z)}\right)^s \!\!\cdot (1+z)^x= \sum_{n=0}^\infty \frac{z^n}{n!}\,\beta^{(s)}_n(x) \,,\qquad |z|<1\,,$$

and therefore

$$n!G_n=\beta^{(1)}_n(0)$$

Blagouchine introduced numbers G_{n}(k) such that

$$n!G_n(k)=\sum_{\ell=1}^n \frac{s(n,\ell)}{\ell+k} ,$$

obtained their generating function and studied their asymptotics at large n. Clearly, G_{n} = G_{n}(1). These numbers are strictly alternating G_{n}(k) = (-1)^{n-1}|G_{n}(k)| and involved in various expansions for the zeta-functions, Euler's constant and polygamma functions. A different generalization of the same kind was also proposed by Komatsu

$$c_n^{(k)}=\sum_{\ell=0}^n \frac{s(n,\ell)}{(\ell+1)^k},$$

so that G_{n} = c_{n}^{(1)}/n! Numbers c_{n}^{(k)} are called by the author poly-Cauchy numbers. Coffey defines polynomials

$$P_{n+1}(y)=\frac 1 {n!} \int_0^y x(1-x)(2-x)\cdots(n-1-x)\, dx$$

and therefore |G_{n}| = P_{n+1}(1).

== See also ==
- Stirling polynomials
- Bernoulli polynomials of the second kind
