= Isador M. Sheffer =

American mathematician

- Born: October 15, 1901; Massachusetts
- Died: April 20, 1992 (aged 90)
- Known for: Sheffer sequence
- Scientific career
- Fields: mathematics
- Doctoral advisor: G. D. Birkhoff

Isador Mitchell Sheffer (October 15, 1901–April 20, 1992) was an American mathematician best known for the Sheffer sequence of polynomials. Born in Massachusetts, he lived a large portion of his life in State College, Pennsylvania, where he was a Professor of Mathematics at Pennsylvania State University.

He received his PhD from Harvard University in 1927, under the direction of George Birkhoff.
