= Stirling numbers of the first kind =

Count of permutations by cycles

In mathematics, especially in combinatorics, Stirling numbers of the first kind arise in the study of permutations. In particular, the unsigned Stirling numbers of the first kind count permutations according to their number of cycles (counting fixed points as cycles of length one).

The Stirling numbers of the first and second kind can be understood as inverses of one another when viewed as triangular matrices. This article is devoted to specifics of Stirling numbers of the first kind. Identities linking the two kinds appear in the article on Stirling numbers.

== Definitions ==
=== Definition by algebra ===
The Stirling numbers of the first kind are the coefficients $s(n,k)$ in the expansion of the falling factorial

$$(x)_n = x(x-1)(x-2)\cdots(x-n+1)$$

into powers of the variable $x$:

$$(x)_n = \sum_{k=0}^n s(n,k) x^k,$$

For example, $(x)_3 = x(x-1)(x - 2) = x^3 - 3x^2 + 2x$, leading to the values $s(3, 3) = 1$, $s(3, 2) = -3$, and $s(3, 1) = 2$. By the empty product convention, $(x)_0 = 1$ and therefore $s(0, 0) = 1$.

The unsigned Stirling numbers may also be defined algebraically as the coefficients of the rising factorial:

$$x^{\overline{n}} = x(x+1)\cdots(x+n-1)=\sum_{k=0}^n \left[{n\atop k}\right] x^k$$.

The notations used on this page for Stirling numbers are not universal, and may conflict with notations in other sources; the square bracket notation $\left[{n\atop k}\right]$ is also common notation for the Gaussian coefficients.

=== Definition by permutation ===
Subsequently, it was discovered that the absolute values $|s(n,k)|$ of these numbers are equal to the number of permutations of certain kinds. These absolute values, which are known as unsigned Stirling numbers of the first kind, are often denoted $c(n,k)$ or $\left[{n\atop k}\right]$. They may be defined directly to be the number of permutations of $n$ elements with $k$ disjoint cycles.

For example, of the $3! = 6$ permutations of three elements, there is one permutation with three cycles (the identity permutation, given in one-line notation by $123$ or in cycle notation by $(1)(2)(3)$), three permutations with two cycles ($132 = (1)(23)$, $213 = (12)(3)$, and $321 = (13)(2)$) and two permutations with one cycle ($312 = (132)$ and $231 = (123)$). Thus $\left[{3\atop 3}\right] = 1$, $\left[{3\atop 2}\right] = 3,$ and $\left[{3\atop 1}\right] = 2$. These can be seen to agree with the previous algebraic calculations of $s(n, k)$ for $n = 3$.

s(4,2)=11

For another example, the image at right shows that $\left[{4\atop 2}\right] = 11$: the symmetric group on 4 objects has 3 permutations of the form

$(\bullet \bullet)(\bullet \bullet)$ (having 2 orbits, each of size 2),

and 8 permutations of the form

$(\bullet\bullet\bullet)(\bullet)$ (having 1 orbit of size 3 and 1 orbit of size 1).

These numbers can be calculated by considering the orbits as conjugacy classes. Alfréd Rényi observed that the unsigned Stirling number of the first kind $\left[{n\atop k}\right]$ also counts the number of permutations of size $n$ with $k$ left-to-right maxima.

=== Signs ===
The signs of the signed Stirling numbers of the first kind depend only on the parity of n − k.

$$s(n,k) = (-1)^{n-k}  \left[{n \atop k}\right] .$$

== Recurrence relation ==
The unsigned Stirling numbers of the first kind follow the recurrence relation
$$\left[{n+1\atop k}\right] = n \left[{n\atop k}\right] + \left[{n\atop k-1}\right]$$
for $k > 0$, with the boundary conditions
$$\left[{0\atop 0}\right] = 1 \quad\mbox{and}\quad \left[{n\atop 0}\right]=\left[{0\atop n}\right]=0$$
for $n>0$. It follows immediately that the signed Stirling numbers of the first kind satisfy the recurrence
$$s(n+1, k) = -n \cdot s(n, k) + s(n, k - 1)$$
with the same base cases.

Algebraic proof

We prove the recurrence relation using the definition of Stirling numbers in terms of rising factorials. Distributing the last term of the product, we have

$$x^{\overline{n+1}} = x(x+1)\cdots (x+n-1)(x+n) = n\cdot x^{\overline{n}}+x \cdot x^{\overline{n}}.$$

The coefficient of $x^k$ on the left-hand side of this equation is $\left[{n+1\atop k}\right]$. The coefficient of $x^k$ in $n \cdot x^{\overline{n}}$ is $n \cdot \left[{n\atop k}\right]$, while the coefficient of $x^k$ in $x \cdot x^{\overline{n}}$ is $\left[{n\atop k - 1}\right]$. Since the two sides are equal as polynomials, the coefficients of $x^k$ on both sides must be equal, and the result follows.

Combinatorial proof

We prove the recurrence relation using the definition of Stirling numbers in terms of permutations with a given number of cycles (or equivalently, orbits).

Consider forming a permutation of $n+1$ objects from a permutation of $n$ objects by adding a distinguished object. There are exactly two ways in which this can be accomplished. We could do this by forming a singleton cycle, i.e., leaving the extra object alone. This increases the number of cycles by 1 and so accounts for the $\left[{n\atop k-1}\right]$ term in the recurrence formula. We could also insert the new object into one of the existing cycles. Consider an arbitrary permutation of $n$ objects with $k$ cycles, and label the objects $a_1,\dots,a_n$, so that the permutation is represented by

$$\displaystyle\underbrace{(a_1 \ldots a_{j_1})(a_{j_1+1} \ldots a_{j_2})\ldots(a_{j_{k-1}+1} \ldots a_n)}_{ k\ \mathrm{cycles}}.$$

To form a new permutation of $n+1$ objects and $k$ cycles one must insert the new object into this array. There are $n$ ways to perform this insertion, inserting the new object immediately following any of the $a_i$ already present. This explains the $n \left[{n\atop k}\right]$ term of the recurrence relation. These two cases include all possibilities, so the recurrence relation follows.

== Table of values ==
Below is a table of unsigned values for the Stirling numbers of the first kind, similar in form to Pascal's triangle. These values are easy to generate using the recurrence relation in the previous section.

k n	0	1	2	3	4	5	6	7	8	9	10
0	1	0									
1	0	1	0								
2	0	1	1	0							
3	0	2	3	1	0						
4	0	6	11	6	1	0					
5	0	24	50	35	10	1	0				
6	0	120	274	225	85	15	1	0			
7	0	720	1764	1624	735	175	21	1	0		
8	0	5040	13068	13132	6769	1960	322	28	1	0	
9	0	40320	109584	118124	67284	22449	4536	546	36	1	0
10	0	362880	1026576	1172700	723680	269325	63273	9450	870	45	1

== Properties ==
=== Simple identities ===
Using the Kronecker delta one has

$$\begin{align}
\left[{n \atop 0}\right] &= \delta_{n0} = \delta_n\\
\left[{0\atop k}\right] &= 0, k>0;&&\left[{n\atop k}\right] = 0, k > n\\
\left[{n \atop 1}\right] &= (n-1)!\\
\left[{n\atop n}\right] &= 1\\
\left[{n\atop n-1}\right] &= {n \choose 2}\\
\left[{n\atop n-2}\right] &= \frac{3n-1}{4} {n \choose 3}\\
\left[{n\atop n-3}\right] &= {n \choose 2} {n \choose 4}\\
\end{align}$$

Similar relationships involving the Stirling numbers hold for the Bernoulli polynomials. Many relations for the Stirling numbers shadow similar relations on the binomial coefficients. The study of these 'shadow relationships' is termed umbral calculus and culminates in the theory of Sheffer sequences. Generalizations of the Stirling numbers of both kinds to arbitrary complex-valued inputs may be extended through the relations of these triangles to the Stirling convolution polynomials.

Combinatorial proofs

These identities may be derived by enumerating permutations directly. For example, a permutation of n elements with n − 3 cycles must have one of the following forms:

- n − 6 fixed points and three two-cycles
- n − 5 fixed points, a three-cycle and a two-cycle, or
- n − 4 fixed points and a four-cycle.

The three types may be enumerated as follows:

- choose the six elements that go into the two-cycles, decompose them into two-cycles and take into account that the order of the cycles is not important:
  $${n \choose 6} {6 \choose 2, 2, 2} \frac{1}{6}$$
- choose the five elements that go into the three-cycle and the two-cycle, choose the elements of the three-cycle and take into account that three elements generate two three-cycles:
  $${n \choose 5} {5 \choose 3} \times 2$$
- choose the four elements of the four-cycle and take into account that four elements generate six four-cycles:
  $${n \choose 4} \times 6.$$

Sum the three contributions to obtain
$${n \choose 6} {6 \choose 2, 2, 2} \frac{1}{6} +
{n \choose 5} {5 \choose 3} \times 2 +
{n \choose 4} \times 6 =
{n \choose 2} {n \choose 4}.$$

Note that all the combinatorial proofs above use either binomials or multinomials of $n$.

Therefore if $p$ is prime, then:

$p\ |\left[{p\atop k}\right]$ for $1<k<p$.

=== Expansions for fixed k ===
Since the Stirling numbers are the coefficients of a polynomial with roots 0, 1, ..., n − 1, one has by Vieta's formulas that

$$\left[ \begin{matrix} n \\ n - k \end{matrix} \right] = \sum_{0 \leq i_1 < \ldots < i_k < n} i_1 i_2 \cdots i_k.$$

In other words, the Stirling numbers of the first kind are given by elementary symmetric polynomials evaluated at 0, 1, ..., n − 1. In this form, the simple identities given above take the form

$$\left[ \begin{matrix} n \\ n - 1 \end{matrix} \right]  = \sum_{i = 0}^{n - 1} i = \binom{n}{2},$$
$$\left[ \begin{matrix} n \\ n - 2 \end{matrix} \right]  = \sum_{i = 0}^{n - 1}\sum_{j = 0}^{i - 1} ij = \frac{3n - 1}{4} \binom{n}{3},$$
$$\left[ \begin{matrix} n \\ n - 3 \end{matrix} \right]  = \sum_{i = 0}^{n - 1}\sum_{j = 0}^{i - 1}\sum_{k = 0}^{j - 1} ijk = \binom{n}{2} \binom{n}{4},$$
and so on.

One may produce alternative forms for the Stirling numbers of the first kind with a similar approach preceded by some algebraic manipulation: since

$$(x+1)(x+2) \cdots (x+n-1)
= (n-1)! \cdot (x+1) \left(\frac{x}{2}+1\right) \cdots \left(\frac{x}{n-1}+1\right),$$

it follows from Newton's formulas that one can expand the Stirling numbers of the first kind in terms of generalized harmonic numbers. This yields identities like

$$\begin{align}
\left[{n\atop 2}\right] &= (n-1)!\; H_{n-1}\\
\left[{n\atop 3}\right] &= \frac{(n-1)!}{2} \left( H_{n-1}^2 - H_{n-1,2} \right)\\
\left[{n\atop 4}\right] &= \frac{(n-1)!}{6} \left(H_{n-1}\left( H_{n-1}^2 - 3H_{n-1,2} \right) +2H_{n-1,3} \right)\\
\end{align}$$

where H_{n} is the harmonic number $H_n = \frac{1}{1} + \frac{1}{2} + \ldots + \frac{1}{n}$ and H_{n,m} = H_{n}^{(m)} is the generalized harmonic number
$$H_n^{(m)} = H_{n,m} = \frac{1}{1^m} + \frac{1}{2^m} + \ldots + \frac{1}{n^m}.$$

These relations can be generalized to give
$$\frac{1}{(n-1)!} \left[\begin{matrix} n \\ k+1 \end{matrix} \right] = \sum_{i_1=1}^{n-1} \sum_{i_2=i_1+1}^{n-1} \cdots \sum_{i_k=i_{k-1}+1}^{n-1} \frac{1}{i_1 i_2 \cdots i_k}  = \frac{w(n, k)}{k!}$$
where w(n, m) is defined recursively in terms of the generalized harmonic numbers by
$$w(n, m) = \delta_{m, 0} + \sum_{k=0}^{m-1} (1-m)_k H_{n-1}^{(k+1)} w(n, m-1-k).$$
(Here δ is the Kronecker delta function and $(m)_k$ is the Pochhammer symbol.)

For fixed $n \geq 0$ these weighted harmonic number expansions are generated by the generating function

$$\frac{1}{n!} \left[\begin{matrix} n+1 \\ k \end{matrix} \right] = [x^k]\exp\left(\sum_{m \geq 1} \frac{(-1)^{m-1} H_n^{(m)}}{m} x^m\right),$$

where the notation $[x^k]$ means extraction of the coefficient of $x^k$ from the following formal power series (see the non-exponential Bell polynomials and section 3 of).

More generally, sums related to these weighted harmonic number expansions of the Stirling numbers of the first kind can be defined through generalized zeta series transforms of generating functions.

One can also "invert" the relations for these Stirling numbers given in terms of the $k$-order harmonic numbers to write the integer-order generalized harmonic numbers in terms of weighted sums of terms involving the Stirling numbers of the first kind. For example, when $k = 2, 3$ the second-order and third-order harmonic numbers are given by

$$(n!)^2 \cdot H_n^{(2)} = \left[ \begin{matrix} n+1 \\ 2 \end{matrix} \right]^2 - 2 \left[ \begin{matrix} n+1 \\ 1 \end{matrix} \right] \left[ \begin{matrix} n+1 \\ 3 \end{matrix} \right]$$

$$(n!)^3 \cdot H_n^{(3)} = \left[ \begin{matrix} n+1 \\ 2 \end{matrix} \right]^3 - 3 \left[ \begin{matrix} n+1 \\ 1 \end{matrix} \right] \left[ \begin{matrix} n+1 \\ 2 \end{matrix} \right] \left[ \begin{matrix} n+1 \\ 3 \end{matrix} \right] + 3 \left[ \begin{matrix} n+1 \\ 1 \end{matrix} \right]^2 \left[ \begin{matrix} n+1 \\ 4 \end{matrix} \right].$$

More generally, one can invert the Bell polynomial generating function for the Stirling numbers expanded in terms of the $m$-order harmonic numbers to obtain that for integers $m \geq 2$

$$H_n^{(m)} = -m  \times [x^m]\log\left(1+\sum_{k \geq 1} \left[ \begin{matrix} n+1 \\ k+1 \end{matrix} \right] \frac{(-x)^k}{n!}\right).$$

=== Finite sums ===
Since permutations are partitioned by number of cycles, one has

$$\sum_{k=0}^n \left[{n\atop k}\right] = n!$$

The identities

$$\sum_{k=0}^n \left[{n\atop k}\right]u^k = n!\binom{n+u-1}{u-1},\,u>0$$

and

$$\sum_{j=k}^{n} {\left[{n\atop j}\right]\binom{j}{k}} = \left[{n+1\atop k+1}\right]$$

can be proved by the techniques at Stirling numbers and exponential generating functions#Stirling numbers of the first kind and Binomial coefficient#Ordinary generating functions.

The table in section 6.1 of Concrete Mathematics provides a plethora of generalized forms of finite sums involving the Stirling numbers. Several particular finite sums relevant to this article include

$$\begin{align}
\left[{n \atop m} \right] & = \sum_{k=m}^n \left[{n+1 \atop k+1 } \right] \binom{k}{m} (-1)^{m-k} \\
\left[{n+1 \atop m+1 } \right] &= \sum_{k=m}^n \left[{k \atop m } \right] \frac{n!}{k!} \\
\left[{m+n+1 \atop m } \right] & = \sum_{k=0}^m (n+k) \left[{n+k \atop k}\right] \\
\left[{n \atop l+m } \right] \binom{l+m}{l} & = \sum_k \left[{k \atop l} \right] \left[{n-k \atop m } \right] \binom{n}{k}.
\end{align}$$

Additionally, if we define the second-order Eulerian numbers by the triangular recurrence relation

$$\left\langle \!\! \left\langle {n \atop k} \right\rangle \!\! \right\rangle = (k+1) \left\langle \!\! \left\langle {n-1 \atop k} \right\rangle \!\! \right\rangle + (2n-1-k) \left\langle \!\! \left\langle {n-1 \atop k-1} \right\rangle \!\! \right\rangle,$$

we arrive at the following identity related to the form of the Stirling convolution polynomials which can be employed to generalize both Stirling number triangles to arbitrary real, or complex-valued, values of the input $x$:

$$\left[{x \atop x-n}\right] = \sum_{k=0}^n \left\langle \!\! \left\langle {n \atop k} \right\rangle \!\! \right\rangle \binom{x+k}{2n}.$$

Particular expansions of the previous identity lead to the following identities expanding the Stirling numbers of the first kind for the first few small values of $n := 1, 2, 3$:

$$\begin{align}
\left[\begin{matrix} x \\ x-1 \end{matrix} \right] & = \binom{x}{2} \\
\left[\begin{matrix} x \\ x-2 \end{matrix} \right] & = \binom{x}{4} + 2 \binom{x+1}{4} \\
\left[\begin{matrix} x \\ x-3 \end{matrix} \right] & = \binom{x}{6} + 8 \binom{x+1}{6} + 6 \binom{x+2}{6}.
\end{align}$$

Software tools for working with finite sums involving Stirling numbers and Eulerian numbers are provided by the RISC Stirling.m package utilities in Mathematica. Other software packages for guessing formulas for sequences (and polynomial sequence sums) involving Stirling numbers and other special triangles is available for both Mathematica and Sage here and here, respectively.

=== Congruences ===
The following congruence identity may be proved via a generating function-based approach:

$$\begin{align}
\left[\begin{matrix} n \\ m \end{matrix} \right] & \equiv
\binom{\lfloor n/2 \rfloor}{m - \lceil n/2 \rceil} =
[x^m] \left(
x^{\lceil n/2 \rceil} (x+1)^{\lfloor n/2 \rfloor}
\right) && \pmod{2},
\end{align}$$

More recent results providing Jacobi-type J-fractions that generate the single factorial function and generalized factorial-related products lead to other new congruence results for the Stirling numbers of the first kind. For example, working modulo $2$ we can prove that

$$\begin{align}
\left[\begin{matrix} n \\ 1 \end{matrix} \right] & \equiv
\frac{2^{n}}{4} [n \geq 2] + [n = 1] && \pmod{2} \\
\left[\begin{matrix} n \\ 2 \end{matrix} \right] & \equiv
\frac{3 \cdot 2^{n}}{16} (n-1) [n \geq 3] +
[n = 2] && \pmod{2} \\
\left[\begin{matrix} n \\ 3 \end{matrix} \right] & \equiv
2^{n-7} (9n-20) (n-1) [n \geq 4] +
[n = 3] && \pmod{2} \\
\left[\begin{matrix} n \\ 4 \end{matrix} \right] & \equiv
2^{n-9} (3n-10) (3n-7) (n-1) [n \geq 5] +
[n = 4] && \pmod{2}
\end{align}$$

Where $[b]$ is the Iverson bracket.

and working modulo $3$ we can similarly prove that

$$\begin{align}
\left[\begin{matrix} n \\ m \end{matrix} \right] & \equiv [x^m] (x^{\lceil n/3 \rceil} (x+1)^{\lceil (n-1)/3 \rceil} (x+2)^{\lfloor n/3 \rfloor} && \pmod{3} \\
& \equiv \sum_{k=0}^m \binom{\lceil (n-1)/3 \rceil}{k} \binom{\lfloor n/3 \rfloor}{m-k-\lfloor n/3 \rfloor} 2^{\lceil n/3 \rceil + \lfloor n/3 \rfloor - m + k} && \pmod{3}
\end{align}$$

More generally, for fixed integers $h \geq 3$ if we define the ordered roots

$$\left(\omega_{h,i}\right)_{i=1}^{h-1} :=
\left\{ \omega_j :
\sum_{i=0}^{h-1} \binom{h-1}{i} \frac{h!}{(i+1)!} (-\omega_j)^{i} = 0,\
1 \leq j < h \right\},$$

then we may expand congruences for these Stirling numbers defined as the coefficients

$$\left[\begin{matrix} n \\ m \end{matrix} \right] = [R^m] R(R+1) \cdots (R+n-1),$$

in the following form where the functions, $p_{h,i}^{[m]}(n)$, denote fixed polynomials of degree $m$ in $n$ for each $h$, $m$, and $i$:

$$\left[\begin{matrix} n \\ m \end{matrix} \right] =
\left(\sum_{i=0}^{h-1} p_{h,i}^{[m]}(n) \times \omega_{h,i}^{n}
\right) [n > m] + [n = m] \qquad \pmod{h},$$

Section 6.2 of the reference cited above provides more explicit expansions related to these congruences for the $r$-order harmonic numbers and for the generalized factorial products, $p_n(\alpha, R) := R(R+\alpha)\cdots(R+(n-1)\alpha)$.

=== Generating functions ===
A variety of identities may be derived by manipulating the generating function (see change of basis):

$$H(z,u)= (1+z)^u = \sum_{n=0}^\infty {u \choose n} z^n = \sum_{n=0}^\infty \frac{z^n}{n!} \sum_{k=0}^n s(n,k) u^k
= \sum_{k=0}^\infty u^k \sum_{n=k}^\infty \frac {z^n}{n!} s(n,k).$$

Using the equality

$$(1+z)^u = e^{u\log(1+z)} = \sum_{k = 0}^\infty (\log(1 + z))^k \frac{u^k}{k!},$$

it follows that

$$\sum_{n=k}^\infty s(n,k) \frac{z^n}{n!} = \frac{(\log (1+z))^k}{k!}$$

and

$\sum_{n=k}^\infty \left[ {n \atop k} \right] \frac{z^n}{n!} = \frac{(-\log(1-z))^k}{k!}.$

This identity is valid for formal power series, and the sum converges in the complex plane for |z| < 1.

Other identities arise by exchanging the order of summation, taking derivatives, making substitutions for z or u, etc. For example, we may derive:

$$\frac{\log^m (1+z)}{1+z}
=  m!\sum_{k=0}^\infty \frac { s(k+1,m+1)\,z^k}{k!} ,\qquad m=1,2,3,\ldots\quad |z|<1$$

or

$$\sum_{n=i}^\infty \frac{\left[{n\atop i}\right]}{n \, (n!)}  = \zeta(i+1),\qquad i=1,2,3,\ldots$$

and

$$\sum_{n=i}^\infty \frac{\left[{n\atop i}\right]}{n \, (v)_n}  = \zeta(i+1,v),\qquad i=1,2,3,\ldots\quad \Re(v)>0$$

where $\zeta(k)$ and $\zeta(k,v)$ are the Riemann zeta function and the Hurwitz zeta function respectively, and even evaluate this integral

$$\int_0^1 \frac{\log^z(1-x)}{x^k} \, dx = \frac{(-1)^z \Gamma(z+1)}{(k-1)!}\sum_{r=1}^{k-1} s(k-1,r)\sum_{m=0}^r \binom{r}{m}(k-2)^{r-m} \zeta(z+1-m) ,\qquad \Re(z) > k-1 ,\quad k=3,4,5,\ldots$$

where $\Gamma(z)$ is the gamma function. There also exist more complicated expressions for the zeta-functions involving the Stirling numbers. One, for example, has

$$\zeta(s,v) = \frac{k!}{(s-k)_k}\sum_{n=0}^\infty \frac{1}{(n+k)!}\left[{n+k \atop n}\right]\sum_{l=0}^{n+k-1}\!(-1)^l \binom{n+k-1}{l} (l+v)^{k-s},\quad k=1, 2, 3,\ldots$$

This series generalizes Hasse's series for the Hurwitz zeta-function (we obtain Hasse's series by setting k=1).

=== Asymptotics ===
The next estimate given in terms of the Euler gamma constant applies:

$$\left[ \begin{matrix} n+1 \\ k+1 \end{matrix} \right] \underset{n \to \infty}{\sim} \frac{n!}{k!} \left(\gamma+\ln n\right)^k,\ \text{ uniformly for } k = o(\ln n).$$

For fixed $n$ we have the following estimate :

$$\left[ \begin{matrix} n+k \\ k \end{matrix} \right] \underset{k \to \infty}{\sim} \frac{k^{2n}}{2^n n!}.$$

=== Explicit formula ===
No one-sum formula for Stirling numbers of the first kind is currently known. A two-sum formula can be obtained using one of the symmetric formulae for Stirling numbers in conjunction with the explicit formula for Stirling numbers of the second kind.

$$\left[{ n \atop k } \right] = \sum_{j=n}^{2n-k} \binom{j-1}{k-1} \binom{2n-k}{j} \sum_{m=0}^{j-n} \frac{(-1)^{m+n-k} m^{j-k}}{m! (j-n-m)!}$$

As discussed earlier, by Vieta's formulas, one get
$$\left[ \begin{matrix} n \\ k \end{matrix} \right] = \sum_{0 \leq i_1 < \ldots < i_{n-k} < n} i_1 i_2 \cdots i_{n-k}.$$
The Stirling number s(n,n-p) can be found from the formula

$$\begin{align}
s(n,n-p)  &= \frac{1}{(n-p-1)!} \sum_{0 \leq k_1, \ldots , k_p : \sum_1^p mk_m = p}  (-1)^K
\frac{(n+K-1)!}{k_1! k_2! \cdots  k_p! ~ 2!^{k_1} 3!^{k_2} \cdots (p+1)!^{k_p}} ,
\end{align}$$

where $K =k_1 + \cdots + k_p.$ The sum is a sum over all partitions of p.

Another exact nested sum expansion for these Stirling numbers is computed by elementary symmetric polynomials corresponding to the coefficients in $x$ of a product of the form $(1+c_1 x) \cdots (1+c_{n-1}x)$. In particular, we see that

$$\begin{align}
\left[ {n \atop k+1} \right] & = [x^k] (x+1)(x+2) \cdots (x+n-1)
= (n-1)! \cdot [x^k] (x+1) \left(\frac{x}{2}+1\right) \cdots \left(\frac{x}{n-1}+1\right) \\
& = \sum_{1 \leq i_1 < \cdots < i_k < n} \frac{(n-1)!}{i_1 \cdots i_k}.
\end{align}$$

Newton's identities combined with the above expansions may be used to give an alternate proof of the weighted expansions involving the generalized harmonic numbers already noted above.

=== Relations to natural logarithm function ===
The nth derivative of the μth power of the natural logarithm involves the signed Stirling numbers of the first kind:

${\operatorname{d}^n\!(\ln x)^\mu\over\operatorname{d}\!x^n}=x^{-n}\sum_{k=1}^{n}\mu^{\underline{k}}s(n,n-k+1)(\ln x)^{\mu-k},$

where $\mu^\underline{i}$ is the falling factorial, and $s(n,n-k+1)$ is the signed Stirling number.

It can be proved by using mathematical induction.

=== Other formulas ===
Stirling numbers of the first kind appear in the formula for Gregory coefficients and in a finite sum identity involving Bell numbers

$n! G_n = \sum_{l=0}^n \frac{s(n,l)}{l+1}$

$\sum_{j=0}^n \binom{n}{j} B_j k^{n-j} = \sum_{i=0}^k \left[{k \atop i}\right] B_{n+i} (-1)^{k-i}$

Infinite series involving the finite sums with the Stirling numbers often lead to the special functions. For example

$\ln\Gamma(z) = \left(z-\frac{1}{2}\right)\!\ln z -z +\frac{1}{2}\ln2\pi + \frac{1}{\pi} \sum_{n=1}^\infty\frac{ 1}{n\cdot n!}\!\sum_{l=0}^{\lfloor n/2\rfloor}\! \frac{(-1)^{l} (2l)!}{(2\pi z)^{2l+1}} \left[{n\atop 2l+1}\right]$

and

$\Psi(z) = \ln z - \frac{1}{2z} - \frac{1}{\pi z} \sum_{n=1}^\infty\frac{ 1}{n\cdot n!}\!\sum_{l=0}^{\lfloor n/2 \rfloor}\! \frac{(-1)^{l}(2l+1)!}{(2\pi z)^{2l+1}} \left[{n\atop 2l+1}\right]$

or even

$\gamma_m=\frac{1}{2}\delta_{m,0}+\frac{(-1)^m m!}{\pi} \!\sum_{n=1}^\infty\frac{1}{n\cdot n!} \! \sum_{k=0}^{\lfloor n/2\rfloor}\frac{(-1)^{k}}{(2\pi)^{2k+1}} \left[{2k+2\atop m+1}\right] \left[{n\atop 2k+1}\right] \,$

where γ_{m} are the Stieltjes constants and δ_{m,0} represents the Kronecker delta function.

Notice that this last identity immediately implies relations between the polylogarithm functions, the Stirling number exponential generating functions given above, and the Stirling-number-based power series for the generalized Nielsen polylogarithm functions.

== Generalizations ==
There are many notions of generalized Stirling numbers that may be defined (depending on application) in a number of differing combinatorial contexts. In so much as the Stirling numbers of the first kind correspond to the coefficients of the distinct polynomial expansions of the single factorial function, $n! = n (n-1) (n-2) \cdots 2 \cdot 1$, we may extend this notion to define triangular recurrence relations for more general classes of products.

In particular, for any fixed arithmetic function $f: \mathbb{N} \rightarrow \mathbb{C}$ and symbolic parameters $x, t$, related generalized factorial products of the form

$$(x)_{n,f,t} := \prod_{k=1}^{n-1} \left(x+\frac{f(k)}{t^k}\right)$$

may be studied from the point of view of the classes of generalized Stirling numbers of the first kind defined by the following coefficients of the powers of $x$ in the expansions of $(x)_{n,f,t}$ and then by the next corresponding triangular recurrence relation:

$$\begin{align}
\left[\begin{matrix} n \\ k \end{matrix} \right]_{f,t} & = [x^{k-1}] (x)_{n,f,t} \\
& = f(n-1) t^{1-n} \left[\begin{matrix} n-1 \\ k \end{matrix} \right]_{f,t} + \left[\begin{matrix} n-1 \\ k-1 \end{matrix} \right]_{f,t} + \delta_{n,0} \delta_{k,0}.
\end{align}$$

These coefficients satisfy a number of analogous properties to those for the Stirling numbers of the first kind as well as recurrence relations and functional equations related to the f-harmonic numbers, $F_n^{(r)}(t) := \sum_{k \leq n} t^k / f(k)^r$.

One special case of these bracketed coefficients corresponding to $t \equiv 1$ allows us to expand the multiple factorial, or multifactorial functions as polynomials in $n$.

The Stirling numbers of both kinds, the binomial coefficients, and the first and second-order Eulerian numbers are all defined by special cases of a triangular super-recurrence of the form

$$\left|\begin{matrix} n \\ k \end{matrix} \right| = (\alpha n + \beta k + \gamma) \left|\begin{matrix} n-1 \\ k \end{matrix} \right| + (\alpha^{\prime} n + \beta^{\prime} k + \gamma^{\prime}) \left|\begin{matrix} n-1 \\ k-1 \end{matrix} \right| + \delta_{n,0} \delta_{k,0},$$

for integers $n, k \geq 0$ and where
$$\left|\begin{matrix} n \\ k \end{matrix} \right| \equiv 0$$
whenever $n < 0$ or $k < 0$. In this sense, the form of the Stirling numbers of the first kind may also be generalized by this parameterized super-recurrence for fixed scalars $\alpha, \beta, \gamma, \alpha^{\prime}, \beta^{\prime}, \gamma^{\prime}$ (not all zero).

== See also ==
- Stirling numbers
- Stirling numbers of the second kind
- Stirling polynomials
- Random permutation statistics
