= Stieltjes constants =

Constants in the zeta function's Laurent series expansion

The area of the blue region converges on the Euler–Mascheroni constant, which is the 0th Stieltjes constant.

In mathematics, the Stieltjes constants are the numbers $\gamma_k$ that occur in the Laurent series expansion of the Riemann zeta function:

$$\zeta(1+s)=\frac{1}{s}+\sum_{n=0}^\infty \frac{(-1)^n}{n!} \gamma_n s^n.$$

The constant $\gamma_0 = \gamma = 0.577\dots$ is known as the Euler–Mascheroni constant.

== Representations ==
The Stieltjes constants are given by the limit

$$\gamma_n = \lim_{m\to\infty} \left\{\sum_{k=1}^m \frac{(\ln k)^n}{k} - \int_1^m\frac{(\ln x)^n}{x}\,dx\right\} = \lim_{m \rightarrow \infty}
{\left\{\sum_{k = 1}^m  \frac{(\ln k)^n}{k} - \frac{(\ln m)^{n+1}}{n+1}\right\}}.$$

(In the case n = 0, the first summand requires evaluation of 0^{0}, which is taken to be 1.)

Cauchy's differentiation formula leads to the integral representation

$$\gamma_n = \frac{(-1)^n n!}{2\pi} \int_0^{2\pi} e^{-nix} \zeta\left(e^{ix}+1\right) dx.$$

Various representations in terms of integrals and infinite series are given in works of Jensen, Franel, Hermite, Hardy, Ramanujan, Ainsworth, Howell, Coppo, Connon, Coffey, Choi, Blagouchine and some other authors. In particular, Jensen-Franel's integral formula, often erroneously attributed to Ainsworth and Howell, states that

$$\gamma_n = \frac{1}{2}\delta_{n,0}+\frac{1}{i}\int_0^\infty  \frac{dx}{e^{2\pi x}-1} \left\{
\frac{(\ln(1-ix))^n}{1-ix} - \frac{(\ln(1+ix))^n}{1+ix}
\right\}\,,
\qquad\quad n=0, 1, 2,\ldots$$

where δ_{n,k} is the Kronecker symbol (Kronecker delta). Among other formulae, we find

$$\gamma_n = -\frac{\pi}{2(n+1)} \int_{-\infty}^\infty
\frac{\left(\ln\left(\frac{1}{2}\pm ix\right)\right)^{n+1}}{\cosh^2 \pi x}\, dx
\qquad\qquad\qquad\qquad\qquad\qquad n=0, 1, 2,\ldots$$

$$\begin{array}{l}
\displaystyle
\gamma_1 =-\left[\gamma -\frac{\ln2}{2}\right]\ln2 + i\int_0^\infty \frac{dx}{e^{\pi x}+1} \left\{
\frac{\ln(1-ix)}{1-ix} - \frac{\ln(1+ix)}{1+ix}
\right\} \\[6mm]
\displaystyle
\gamma_1 = -\gamma^2 - \int_0^\infty \left[\frac{1}{1-e^{-x}}-\frac{1}{x}\right] e^{-x}\ln x \, dx
\end{array}$$

see.

As concerns series representations, a famous series employing an integer part of a logarithm was given by Hardy in 1912

$$\gamma_1 = \frac{\ln2}{2}\sum_{k=2}^\infty \frac{(-1)^k}{k} \lfloor \log_2{k}\rfloor\cdot
\left(2\log_2{k} - \lfloor \log_2{2k}\rfloor\right)$$

Israilov gave semi-convergent series in terms of Bernoulli numbers $B_{2k}$

$$\gamma_m = \sum_{k=1}^n \frac{(\ln k)^m}{k} - \frac{(\ln n)^{m+1}}{m+1}
- \frac{(\ln n)^m}{2n} - \sum_{k=1}^{N-1} \frac{B_{2k}}{(2k)!}\left[\frac{(\ln x)^m}{x}\right]^{(2k-1)}_{x=n}
- \theta\cdot\frac{B_{2N}}{(2N)!}\left[\frac{(\ln x)^m}{x}\right]^{(2N-1)}_{x=n} \,,\qquad 0<\theta<1$$

Connon, Blagouchine and Coppo gave several series with the binomial coefficients

$$\begin{array}{l}
\displaystyle
\gamma_m = -\frac{1}{m+1}\sum_{n=0}^\infty\frac{1}{n+1}
\sum_{k=0}^n (-1)^k \binom{n}{k}(\ln(k+1))^{m+1} \\[7mm]
\displaystyle
\gamma_m = -\frac{1}{m+1}\sum_{n=0}^\infty\frac{1}{n+2}
\sum_{k=0}^n (-1)^k \binom{n}{k}\frac{(\ln(k+1))^{m+1}}{k+1} \\[7mm]
\displaystyle
\gamma_m=-\frac{1}{m+1}\sum_{n=0}^\infty H_{n+1}\sum_{k=0}^n (-1)^k \binom{n}{k}(\ln(k+2))^{m+1}\\[7mm]
\displaystyle
\gamma_m = \sum_{n=0}^\infty\left|G_{n+1}\right| \sum_{k=0}^n
(-1)^k \binom{n}{k}\frac{(\ln(k+1))^m}{k+1}
\end{array}$$

where G_{n} are Gregory's coefficients, also known as reciprocal logarithmic numbers (G_{1}=+1/2, G_{2}=−1/12, G_{3}=+1/24, G_{4}=−19/720,... ). More general series of the same nature include these examples

$$\gamma_m=-\frac{(\ln(1+a))^{m+1}}{m+1} + \sum_{n=0}^\infty (-1)^n \psi_{n+1}(a)
\sum_{k=0}^{n} (-1)^k \binom{n}{k}\frac{(\ln (k+1))^m}{k+1},\quad \Re(a)>-1$$

and

$$\gamma_m=-\frac{1}{r(m+1)}\sum_{l=0}^{r-1}(\ln(1+a+l))^{m+1}  + \frac{1}{r}\sum_{n=0}^\infty (-1)^n N_{n+1,r}(a)
\sum_{k=0}^{n} (-1)^k \binom{n}{k}\frac{(\ln (k+1))^{m}}{k+1},\quad \Re(a)>-1, \; r=1,2,3,\ldots$$

or

$$\gamma_m=-\frac{1}{\tfrac{1}{2}+a}
\left\{\frac{(-1)^m}{m+1}\,\zeta^{(m+1)}(0,1+a)- (-1)^m \zeta^{(m)}(0)
- \sum_{n=0}^\infty (-1)^n \psi_{n+2}(a)
\sum_{k=0}^{n} (-1)^k \binom{n}{k}\frac{(\ln(k+1))^m}{k+1}\right\} ,\quad \Re(a)>-1$$

where ψ_{n}(a) are the Bernoulli polynomials of the second kind and N_{n,r}(a) are the polynomials given by the generating equation

$$\frac{(1+z)^{a+m}-(1+z)^{a}}{\ln(1+z)}=\sum_{n=0}^\infty N_{n,m}(a) z^n , \qquad |z|<1,$$

respectively (note that N_{n,1}(a) = ψ_{n}(a)). Oloa and Tauraso showed that series with harmonic numbers may lead to Stieltjes constants

$$\begin{array}{l}
\displaystyle
\sum_{n=1}^\infty \frac{H_n - (\gamma+\ln n)}{n} =
-\gamma_1 -\frac{1}{2}\gamma^2+\frac{1}{12}\pi^2 \\[6mm]
\displaystyle
\sum_{n=1}^\infty \frac{H^2_n - (\gamma+\ln n)^2}{n} =
-\gamma_2 -2\gamma\gamma_1 -\frac{2}{3}\gamma^3+\frac{5}{3}\zeta(3)
\end{array}$$

Blagouchine obtained slowly-convergent series involving unsigned Stirling numbers of the first kind $\left[{\cdot \atop \cdot}\right]$

$$\gamma_m = \frac{1}{2}\delta_{m,0}+
\frac{(-1)^m m!}{\pi} \sum_{n=1}^\infty\frac{1}{n\cdot n!}
\sum_{k=0}^{\lfloor n/2\rfloor}\frac{(-1)^{k}\cdot\left[{2k+2\atop m+1}\right] \cdot\left[{n\atop 2k+1}\right]}
{(2\pi)^{2k+1}}\,,\qquad m=0,1,2,...,$$

as well as semi-convergent series with rational terms only

$$\gamma_m = \frac{1}{2}\delta_{m,0}+(-1)^{m} m!\cdot\sum_{k=1}^{N}\frac{\left[{2k\atop m+1}\right]\cdot B_{2k}}{(2k)!}
+ \theta\cdot\frac{(-1)^{m} m!\cdot \left[{2N+2\atop m+1}\right]\cdot B_{2N+2}}{(2N+2)!},\qquad 0<\theta<1,$$

where m=0,1,2,... In particular, series for the first Stieltjes constant has a surprisingly simple form

$$\gamma_1 = -\frac{1}{2}\sum_{k=1}^{N}\frac{B_{2k}\cdot H_{2k-1}}{k}
+ \theta\cdot\frac{B_{2N+2}\cdot H_{2N+1}}{2N+2},\qquad 0<\theta<1,$$

where H_{n} is the nth harmonic number. More complicated series for Stieltjes constants are given in works of Lehmer, Liang, Todd, Lavrik, Israilov, Stankus, Keiper, Nan-You, Williams, and Coffey.

== Bounds and asymptotic growth ==
The Stieltjes constants satisfy the bound

$$|\gamma_n| \leq
\begin{cases}
\displaystyle \frac{2(n-1)!}{\pi^n}\,,\qquad &  n=1, 3, 5,\ldots \\[3mm]
\displaystyle \frac{4(n-1)!}{\pi^n}\,,\qquad &  n=2, 4, 6,\ldots
\end{cases}$$

given by Berndt in 1972. Better bounds in terms of elementary functions were obtained by Lavrik

$$|\gamma_n| \leq \frac{n!}{2^{n+1}},\qquad n=1, 2, 3,\ldots$$

by Israilov

$$|\gamma_n| \leq \frac{n! C(k)}{(2k)^{n}},\qquad n=1, 2, 3,\ldots$$

with k=1,2,... and C(1)=1/2, C(2)=7/12,... , by Nan-You and Williams

$$|\gamma_n| \leq
\begin{cases}
\displaystyle \frac{2(2n)!}{n^{n+1}(2\pi)^n}\,,\qquad &  n=1, 3, 5,\ldots \\[4mm]
\displaystyle \frac{4(2n)!}{n^{n+1}(2\pi)^n}\,,\qquad &  n=2, 4, 6,\ldots
\end{cases}$$

by Blagouchine

$$\begin{array}{ll}
\displaystyle-\frac{\big|{B}_{m+1}\big|}{m+1} < \gamma_m  <
\frac{(3m+8)\cdot\big|{B}_{m+3}\big|}{24} - \frac{\big|{B}_{m+1}\big|}{m+1}  ,
& m=1, 5, 9,\ldots\\[12pt]
\displaystyle
\frac{\big|B_{m+1}\big|}{m+1} - \frac{(3m+8)\cdot\big|B_{m+3}\big|}{24}
< \gamma_m  < \frac{\big|{B}_{m+1}\big|}{m+1} , & m=3, 7, 11,\ldots\\[12pt]
\displaystyle -\frac{\big|{B}_{m+2}\big|}{2} < \gamma_m
<  \frac{(m+3)(m+4)\cdot\big|{B}_{m+4}\big|}{48} - \frac{\big|B_{m+2}\big|}{2} ,
\qquad &  m=2, 6, 10, \ldots\\[12pt]
\displaystyle
\frac{\big|{B}_{m+2}\big|}{2} - \frac{(m+3)(m+4)\cdot\big|{B}_{m+4}\big|}{48}
< \gamma_m < \frac{\big|{B}_{m+2}\big|}{2}, & m=4, 8, 12, \ldots\\
\end{array}$$

where B_{n} are Bernoulli numbers, and by Matsuoka

$$|\gamma_n| < 10^{-4} e^{n \ln \ln n}\,,\qquad n=5,6,7,\ldots$$

As concerns estimations resorting to non-elementary functions and solutions, Knessl, Coffey and Fekih-Ahmed obtained quite accurate results. For example, Knessl and Coffey give the following formula that approximates the Stieltjes constants relatively well for large n. If v is the unique solution of

$$2 \pi \exp(v \tan v) = n \frac{\cos(v)}{v}$$

with $0 < v < \pi/2$, and if $u = v \tan v$, then

$$\gamma_n \sim \frac{B}{\sqrt{n}} e^{nA} \cos(an+b)$$

where

$$A = \frac{1}{2} \ln(u^2+v^2) - \frac{u}{u^2+v^2}$$

$$B = \frac{2 \sqrt{2\pi} \sqrt{u^2+v^2}}{[(u+1)^2+v^2]^{1/4}}$$

$$a = \tan^{-1}\left(\frac{v}{u}\right) + \frac{v}{u^2+v^2}$$

$$b = \tan^{-1}\left(\frac{v}{u}\right) - \frac{1}{2} \left(\frac{v}{u+1}\right).$$

Up to n = 100000, the Knessl-Coffey approximation correctly predicts the sign of γ_{n} with the single exception of n = 137.

In 2022 K. Maślanka gave an asymptotic expression for the Stieltjes constants, which is both simpler and more accurate than those previously known. In particular, it reproduces with a relatively small error the troublesome value for n = 137.

Namely, when $n >> 1$

$$\gamma_{n} \sim \sqrt{\frac{2}{\pi}} n! \mathrm{ Re } \frac{\Gamma \left(s_{n}\right) e^{-cs_{n}}}{\left( s_{n}\right) ^{n}\sqrt{n+s_{n}+\frac{3}{2}}}$$

where $s_{n}$ are the saddle points:

$$s_{n}=\frac{n+\frac{3}{2}}{W\left( \pm \frac{n+\frac{3}{2}}{2\pi i}\right) }$$

$W$ is the Lambert function and $c$ is a constant:

$$c=\log (2\pi )+\frac{\pi }{2}i$$

Defining a complex "phase" $\varphi_{n}$

$$\varphi _{n}\equiv \frac{1}{2}\ln (8\pi )-n+(n+\frac{1}{2})\ln (n)+(s_{n}-n-\frac{1}{2})\ln \left( s_{n}\right) -\frac{1}{2}\ln \left( n+s_{n}\right)-(c+1)s_{n}$$

we get a particularly simple expression in which both the rapidly increasing amplitude and the oscillations are clearly seen:

$$\gamma _{n}\sim \mathrm{Re} \left[ e^{\varphi _{n}}\right] =e^{\mathrm{Re}\varphi_{n}}\cos \left(\mathrm{Im}\varphi _{n}\right)$$

== Numerical values ==
The first few values are

| n | approximate value of γ_{n} | OEIS |
| 0 | +0.5772156649015328606065120900824024310421593359 | A001620 |
| 1 | −0.0728158454836767248605863758749013191377363383 | A082633 |
| 2 | −0.0096903631928723184845303860352125293590658061 | A086279 |
| 3 | +0.0020538344203033458661600465427533842857158044 | A086280 |
| 4 | +0.0023253700654673000574681701775260680009044694 | A086281 |
| 5 | +0.0007933238173010627017533348774444448307315394 | A086282 |
| 6 | −0.0002387693454301996098724218419080042777837151 | A183141 |
| 7 | −0.0005272895670577510460740975054788582819962534 | A183167 |
| 8 | −0.0003521233538030395096020521650012087417291805 | A183206 |
| 9 | −0.0000343947744180880481779146237982273906207895 | A184853 |
| 10 | +0.0002053328149090647946837222892370653029598537 | A184854 |
| 100 | −4.2534015717080269623144385197278358247028931053 × 10^{17} | |
| 1000 | −1.5709538442047449345494023425120825242380299554 × 10^{486} | |
| 10000 | −2.2104970567221060862971082857536501900234397174 × 10^{6883} | |
| 100000 | +1.9919273063125410956582272431568589205211659777 × 10^{83432} | |

The n-th Stieltjes constant is positive for

n = 0, 3, 4, 5, 10, 11, 12, 17, 18, 19, 20, 21, 26, 27, 28, 29, 30, ... (sequence A394583 in the OEIS)

and is negative for

n = 1, 2, 6, 7, 8, 9, 13, 14, 15, 16, 22, 23, 24, 25, 31, 32, 33, 34, 35, ... (sequence A395455 in the OEIS)

For large n, the Stieltjes constants grow rapidly in absolute value, and change signs in a complex pattern.

Further information related to the numerical evaluation of Stieltjes constants may be found in works of Keiper, Kreminski, Plouffe, Johansson and Blagouchine. First, Johansson provided values of the Stieltjes constants up to n = 100000, accurate to over 10000 digits each (the numerical values can be retrieved from the LMFDB . Later, Johansson and Blagouchine devised a particularly efficient algorithm for computing generalized Stieltjes constants (see below) for large n and complex a, which can be also used for ordinary Stieltjes constants. In particular, it allows one to compute γ_{n} to 1000 digits in a minute for any n up to n=10^{100}.

== Generalized Stieltjes constants ==
=== General information ===
More generally, one can define Stieltjes constants γ_{n}(a) that occur in the Laurent series expansion of the Hurwitz zeta function:

$$\zeta(s,a)=\frac{1}{s-1}+\sum_{n=0}^\infty \frac{(-1)^n}{n!} \gamma_n(a) (s-1)^n.$$

Here a is a complex number with Re(a)>0. Since the Hurwitz zeta function is a generalization of the Riemann zeta function, we have γ_{n}(1)=γ_{n} . The zeroth constant is simply the digamma-function γ_{0}(a)=-Ψ(a), while other constants are not known to be reducible to any elementary or classical function of analysis. Nevertheless, there are numerous representations for them. For example, there exists the following asymptotic representation

$$\gamma_n(a) = \lim_{m\to\infty}\left\{
\sum_{k=0}^m \frac{(\ln (k+a))^n}{k+a} - \frac{(\ln (m+a))^{n+1}}{n+1}
\right\}, \qquad
\begin{array}{l}
n=0, 1, 2,\ldots \\[1mm]
a\neq0, -1, -2, \ldots
\end{array}$$

due to Berndt and Wilton. The analog of Jensen-Franel's formula for the generalized Stieltjes constant is the Hermite formula

$$\gamma_n(a) =\left[\frac{1}{2a}-\frac{\ln{a}}{n+1} \right](\ln a)^n
-i\int_0^\infty  \frac{dx}{e^{2\pi x}-1} \left\{
\frac{(\ln(a-ix))^n}{a-ix} - \frac{(\ln(a+ix))^n}{a+ix}
\right\} , \qquad
\begin{array}{l}
n=0, 1, 2,\ldots \\[1mm]
\Re(a)>0
\end{array}$$

Similar representations are given by the following formulas:

$$\gamma_n(a) = - \frac{\big(\ln(a-\frac12)\big)^{n+1}}{n+1}
+i\int_0^\infty  \frac{dx}{e^{2\pi x}+1} \left\{
\frac{\big(\ln(a-\frac12-ix)\big)^n}{a-\frac12-ix} - \frac{\big(\ln(a-\frac12+ix)\big)^n}{a-\frac12+ix}
\right\} , \qquad
\begin{array}{l}
n=0, 1, 2,\ldots \\[1mm]
\Re(a)>\frac12
\end{array}$$

and

$$\gamma_n(a) = -\frac{\pi}{2(n+1)}\int_0^\infty  \frac{\big(\ln(a-\frac12-ix)\big)^{n+1} +
\big(\ln(a-\frac12+ix)\big)^{n+1}}{\big(\cosh(\pi x)\big)^2} \, dx  , \qquad
\begin{array}{l}
n=0, 1, 2,\ldots \\[1mm]
\Re(a)>\frac12
\end{array}$$

Generalized Stieltjes constants satisfy the following recurrence relation

$$\gamma_n(a+1) = \gamma_n(a) - \frac{(\ln a)^n}{a} \,, \qquad
\begin{array}{l}
n=0, 1, 2,\ldots \\[1mm]
a\neq0, -1, -2, \ldots
\end{array}$$

as well as the multiplication theorem

$$\sum_{l=0}^{n-1} \gamma_p \left(a+\frac{l}{n} \right) =
(-1)^p n  \left[\frac{\ln n}{p+1} - \Psi(an) \right](\ln n)^p + n\sum_{r=0}^{p-1}(-1)^r \binom{p}{r} \gamma_{p-r}(an) \cdot (\ln n)^r\,,
\qquad\qquad n=2, 3, 4,\ldots$$

where $\binom{p}{r}$ denotes the binomial coefficient (see and, pp. 101–102).

=== First generalized Stieltjes constant ===
The first generalized Stieltjes constant has a number of remarkable properties.

- Malmsten's identity (reflection formula for the first generalized Stieltjes constants): the reflection formula for the first generalized Stieltjes constant has the following form

$$\gamma_1 \biggl(\frac{m}{n}\biggr)- \gamma_1 \biggl(1-\frac{m}{n}
\biggr) =2\pi\sum_{l=1}^{n-1} \sin\frac{2\pi m l}{n} \cdot\ln\Gamma \biggl(\frac{l}{n} \biggr)
-\pi(\gamma+\ln2\pi n)\cot\frac{m\pi}{n}$$

where m and n are positive integers such that m<n. This formula has been long-time attributed to Almkvist and Meurman who derived it in 1990s. However, it was recently reported that this identity, albeit in a slightly different form, was first obtained by Carl Malmsten in 1846.

- Rational arguments theorem: the first generalized Stieltjes constant at rational argument may be evaluated in a quasi-closed form via the following formula:

$$\begin{array}{ll}
\displaystyle
\gamma_1 \biggl(\frac{r}{m}  \biggr)
=& \displaystyle
\gamma_1 +\gamma^2 + \gamma\ln2\pi m + \ln2\pi\cdot\ln{m}+\frac{1}{2}(\ln m)^2
+ (\gamma+\ln2\pi m)\cdot\Psi\left(\frac{r}{m}\right)  \\[5mm]
\displaystyle & \displaystyle\qquad
+\pi\sum_{l=1}^{m-1} \sin\frac{2\pi r l}{m} \cdot\ln\Gamma \biggl(\frac{l}{m} \biggr)
+ \sum_{l=1}^{m-1} \cos\frac{2\pi rl}{m}\cdot\zeta''\left(0,\frac{l}{m}\right)
\end{array}\,,\qquad\quad r=1, 2, 3,\ldots, m-1\,.$$

see Blagouchine. An alternative proof was later proposed by Coffey and several other authors.

- Finite summations: there are numerous summation formulae for the first generalized Stieltjes constants. For example,

$$\begin{array}{ll}
\displaystyle
\sum_{r=0}^{m-1} \gamma_1\left( a+\frac{r}{m}  \right) =
m\ln{m}\cdot\Psi(am) - \frac{m}{2}(\ln m)^2 + m\gamma_1(am)\,,\qquad a\in\mathbb{C}\\[6mm]
\displaystyle
\sum_{r=1}^{m-1} \gamma_1\left(\frac{r}{m} \right) =
(m-1)\gamma_1 - m\gamma\ln{m} - \frac{m}{2}(\ln m)^2 \\[6mm]
\displaystyle
\sum_{r=1}^{2m-1} (-1)^r \gamma_1 \biggl(\frac{r}{2m}  \biggr)
= -\gamma_1+m(2\gamma+\ln2+2\ln m)\ln2\\[6mm]
\displaystyle
\sum_{r=0}^{2m-1} (-1)^r \gamma_1\biggl(\frac{2r+1}{4m} \biggr)
= m\left\{4\pi\ln\Gamma \biggl(\frac{1}{4} \biggr)  - \pi\big(4\ln2+3\ln\pi+\ln m+\gamma \big)\right\}\\[6mm]
\displaystyle
\sum_{r=1}^{m-1} \gamma_1 \biggl(\frac{r}{m}\biggr)
\cdot\cos\dfrac{2\pi rk}{m} = -\gamma_1  + m(\gamma+\ln2\pi m)
\ln\left(2\sin\frac{k\pi}{m}\right)
+\frac{m}{2}
\left\{\zeta''\left( 0,\frac{k}{m}\right) + \zeta''\left( 0,1-\frac{k}{m}\right) \right\}\,, \qquad k=1,2,\ldots,m-1  \\[6mm]
\displaystyle
\sum_{r=1}^{m-1} \gamma_1\biggl(\frac{r}{m} \biggr)
\cdot\sin\dfrac{2\pi rk}{m} =\frac{\pi}{2} (\gamma+\ln2\pi m)(2k-m)
- \frac{\pi m}{2} \left\{\ln\pi -\ln\sin\frac{k\pi}{m} \right\}
+ m\pi\ln\Gamma \biggl(\frac{k}{m} \biggr) \,, \qquad k=1,2,\ldots,m-1 \\[6mm]
\displaystyle
\sum_{r=1}^{m-1} \gamma_1 \biggl(\frac{r}{m} \biggr)\cdot\cot\frac{\pi r}{m}  = \displaystyle
\frac{\pi }{6} \Big\{(1-m)(m-2)\gamma + 2(m^2-1)\ln2\pi - (m^2+2)\ln{m}\Big\}
-2\pi\sum_{l=1}^{m-1} l\cdot\ln\Gamma\left( \frac{l}{m}\right)  \\[6mm]
\displaystyle
\sum_{r=1}^{m-1} \frac{r}{m} \cdot\gamma_1 \biggl(\frac{r}{m}  \biggr) =
\frac{1}{2}\left\{(m-1)\gamma_1 - m\gamma\ln{m} - \frac{m}{2}(\ln m)^2 \right\}
-\frac{\pi}{2m}(\gamma+\ln2\pi m) \sum_{l=1}^{m-1} l\cdot \cot\frac{\pi l}{m}
-\frac{\pi}{2} \sum_{l=1}^{m-1} \cot\frac{\pi l}{m} \cdot\ln\Gamma\biggl(\frac{l}{m}  \biggr)
\end{array}$$

For more details and further summation formulae, see.

- Some particular values: some particular values of the first generalized Stieltjes constant at rational arguments may be reduced to the gamma-function, the first Stieltjes constant, and elementary functions. For instance,

$$\gamma_1\left(\frac{1}{2}\right)  = - 2\gamma\ln 2 - (\ln 2)^2 + \gamma_1 = -1.353459680\ldots$$

At the points 1/4, 3/4, and 1/3, values of first generalized Stieltjes constants were independently obtained by Connon and Blagouchine:

$$\begin{array}{l}
\displaystyle
\gamma_1\left(\frac{1}{4}\right) = 2\pi\ln\Gamma\left(\frac{1}{4}  \right)
- \frac{3\pi}{2}\ln\pi  - \frac{7}{2}(\ln 2)^2 - (3\gamma+2\pi)\ln2 - \frac{\gamma\pi}{2}+\gamma_1 = -5.518076350\ldots  \\[6mm]
\displaystyle
\gamma_1\left(\frac{3}{4} \right) = -2\pi\ln\Gamma\left(\frac{1}{4} \right)
+ \frac{3\pi}{2}\ln\pi - \frac{7}{2}(\ln 2)^2 - (3\gamma-2\pi)\ln2 + \frac{\gamma\pi}{2}+\gamma_1 = -0.3912989024\ldots  \\[6mm]
\displaystyle
\gamma_1\left(\frac{1}{3} \right) = -\frac{3\gamma}{2}\ln3 - \frac{3}{4}(\ln 3)^2
+ \frac{\pi}{4\sqrt{3}}\left\{\ln3 - 8\ln2\pi -2\gamma +12 \ln\Gamma\left(\frac{1}{3}  \right)  \right\}
+ \gamma_1 = -3.259557515\ldots
\end{array}$$

At points 2/3, 1/6, and 5/6:

$$\begin{array}{l}
\displaystyle
\gamma_1\left(\frac{2}{3} \right) = -\frac{3\gamma}{2}\ln3 - \frac{3}{4}(\ln 3)^2
- \frac{\pi}{4\sqrt{3}}\left\{\ln 3 - 8\ln 2\pi -2\gamma + 12 \ln\Gamma\left(\frac{1}{3} \right) \right\}
+ \gamma_1 = -0.5989062842\ldots \\[6mm]
\displaystyle
\gamma_1\left(\frac{1}{6} \right) = -\frac{3\gamma}{2}\ln3 - \frac{3}{4}(\ln 3)^2
- (\ln 2)^2 - (3\ln3+2\gamma)\ln2 + \frac{3\pi\sqrt{3}}{2}\ln\Gamma\left(\frac{1}{6} \right) \\[5mm]
\displaystyle\qquad\qquad\quad
- \frac{\pi}{2\sqrt{3}}\left\{3\ln3 + 11\ln2 + \frac{15}{2}\ln\pi  + 3\gamma \right\} + \gamma_1 = -10.74258252\ldots\\[6mm]
\displaystyle
\gamma_1\left(\frac{5}{6} \right) = -\frac{3\gamma}{2}\ln 3 - \frac{3}{4}(\ln 3)^2
- (\ln 2)^2 - (3\ln3+2\gamma)\ln2 - \frac{3\pi\sqrt{3}}{2}\ln\Gamma\left(\frac{1}{6} \right)  \\[6mm]
\displaystyle\qquad\qquad\quad
+ \frac{\pi}{2\sqrt{3}}\left\{3\ln3 + 11\ln2 + \frac{15}{2}\ln\pi  + 3\gamma \right\}+ \gamma_1 = -0.2461690038\ldots
\end{array}$$

These values were calculated by Blagouchine, due to whom we also have the following:

$$\begin{array}{ll}
\displaystyle
\gamma_1\biggl(\frac{1}{5}  \biggr)=& \displaystyle
\gamma_1  + \frac{\sqrt{5}}{2}\left\{\zeta''\left( 0,\frac{1}{5}\right)
+ \zeta''\left( 0,\frac{4}{5}\right)\right\}
+ \frac{\pi\sqrt{10+2\sqrt5}}{2} \ln\Gamma \biggl(\frac{1}{5} \biggr)
\\[5mm]
& \displaystyle
+ \frac{\pi\sqrt{10-2\sqrt5}}{2} \ln\Gamma \biggl(\frac{2}{5} \biggr)
+\left\{\frac{\sqrt{5}}{2} \ln{2} -\frac{\sqrt{5}}{2} \ln\big(1+\sqrt{5}\big) -\frac{5}{4}\ln5
-\frac{\pi\sqrt{25+10\sqrt5}}{10} \right\}\cdot\gamma \\[5mm]
& \displaystyle
- \frac{\sqrt{5}}{2}\left\{\ln2+\ln5+\ln\pi+\frac{\pi\sqrt{25-10\sqrt5}}{10}\right\}\cdot\ln\big(1+\sqrt{5})
+\frac{\sqrt{5}}{2}(\ln 2)^2 + \frac{\sqrt{5}\big(1-\sqrt{5}\big)}{8}(\ln 5)^2   \\[5mm]
& \displaystyle
+\frac{3\sqrt{5}}{4}\ln2\cdot\ln5 + \frac{\sqrt{5}}{2}\ln2\cdot\ln\pi+\frac{\sqrt{5}}{4}\ln5\cdot\ln\pi
- \frac{\pi\big(2\sqrt{25+10\sqrt5}+5\sqrt{25+2\sqrt5}  \big)}{20}\ln2\\[5mm]
& \displaystyle
- \frac{\pi\big(4\sqrt{25+10\sqrt5}-5\sqrt{5+2\sqrt5}  \big)}{40}\ln5
- \frac{\pi\big(5\sqrt{5+2\sqrt5}+\sqrt{25+10\sqrt5}  \big)}{10}\ln\pi\\[5mm]
& \displaystyle
= -8.030205511\ldots \\[6mm]
\displaystyle
\gamma_1\biggl(\frac{1}{8}  \biggr)
=& \displaystyle\gamma_1  + \sqrt{2}\left\{\zeta''\left( 0,\frac{1}{8}\right)
+ \zeta''\left( 0,\frac{7}{8}\right)\right\}
+ 2\pi\sqrt{2}\ln\Gamma \biggl(\frac{1}{8} \biggr)
-\pi \sqrt{2}\big(1-\sqrt2\big)\ln\Gamma \biggl(\frac{1}{4} \biggr)
\\[5mm]
& \displaystyle
-\left\{\frac{1+\sqrt2}{2}\pi+4\ln{2} +\sqrt{2}\ln\big(1+\sqrt{2}\big) \right\}\cdot\gamma
- \frac{1}{\sqrt{2}}\big(\pi+8\ln2+2\ln\pi\big)\cdot\ln\big(1+\sqrt{2})
\\[5mm]
& \displaystyle
- \frac{7\big(4-\sqrt2\big)}{4}(\ln 2)^2   +  \frac{1}{\sqrt{2}}\ln2\cdot\ln\pi
-\frac{\pi\big(10+11\sqrt2\big)}{4}\ln2
-\frac{\pi\big(3+2\sqrt2\big)}{2}\ln\pi\\[5mm]
& \displaystyle
= -16.64171976\ldots \\[6mm]
\displaystyle
\gamma_1\biggl(\frac{1}{12}  \biggr)
=& \displaystyle\gamma_1  + \sqrt{3}\left\{\zeta''\left( 0,\frac{1}{12}\right)
+ \zeta''\left( 0,\frac{11}{12}\right)\right\}
+ 4\pi\ln\Gamma \biggl(\frac{1}{4} \biggr)
+3\pi \sqrt{3}\ln\Gamma \biggl(\frac{1}{3} \biggr)
\\[5mm]
& \displaystyle
-\left\{\frac{2+\sqrt3}{2}\pi+\frac{3}{2}\ln3 -\sqrt3(1-\sqrt3)\ln{2} +2\sqrt{3}\ln\big(1+\sqrt{3}\big) \right\}\cdot\gamma
\\[5mm]
& \displaystyle
- 2\sqrt3\big(3\ln2+\ln3 +\ln\pi\big)\cdot\ln\big(1+\sqrt{3})
- \frac{7-6\sqrt3}{2}(\ln 2)^2  - \frac{3}{4}(\ln 3)^2  \\[5mm]
& \displaystyle
+  \frac{3\sqrt3(1-\sqrt3)}{2}\ln3\cdot\ln2
+  \sqrt3\ln2\cdot\ln\pi
-\frac{\pi\big(17+8\sqrt3\big)}{2\sqrt3}\ln2 \\[5mm]
& \displaystyle
+\frac{\pi\big(1-\sqrt3\big)\sqrt3}{4}\ln3
-\pi\sqrt3(2+\sqrt3)\ln\pi
= -29.84287823\ldots
\end{array}$$

=== Second generalized Stieltjes constant ===
The second generalized Stieltjes constant is much less studied than the first constant. Similarly to the first generalized Stieltjes constant, the second generalized Stieltjes constant at rational argument may be evaluated via the following formula:

$$\begin{array}{rl}
\displaystyle
\gamma_2 \biggl(\frac{r}{m}  \biggr) =
\gamma_2 + \frac{2}{3}\sum_{l=1}^{m-1}
\cos\frac{2\pi r l}{m} \cdot\zeta'''\left(0,\frac{l}{m}\right)  -
2 (\gamma+\ln2\pi m) \sum_{l=1}^{m-1}
\cos\frac{2\pi r l}{m} \cdot\zeta''\left(0,\frac{l}{m}\right) \\[6mm]
\displaystyle \quad
+ \pi\sum_{l=1}^{m-1}
\sin\frac{2\pi r l}{m} \cdot\zeta''\left(0,\frac{l}{m}\right)
-2\pi(\gamma+\ln2\pi m)
\sum_{l=1}^{m-1}
\sin\frac{2\pi r l}{m} \cdot\ln\Gamma \biggl(\frac{l}{m} \biggr)
- 2\gamma_1 \ln{m}    \\[6mm]
\displaystyle\quad
- \gamma^3
-\left[(\gamma+\ln2\pi m)^2-\frac{\pi^2}{12}\right]\cdot
\Psi\biggl(\frac{r}{m}  \biggr) +
\frac{\pi^3}{12}\cot\frac{\pi r}{m}
-\gamma^2\ln\big(4\pi^2 m^3\big) +\frac{\pi^2}{12}(\gamma+\ln{m}) \\[6mm]
\displaystyle\quad
- \gamma\big((\ln 2\pi)^2 + 4\ln m \cdot\ln 2\pi + 2(\ln m)^2\big)
- \left\{(\ln 2\pi)^2 + 2\ln 2\pi \cdot \ln m + \frac{2}{3}(\ln m)^2\right\}\ln m
\end{array}\,,\qquad\quad r=1, 2, 3,\ldots, m-1.$$

see Blagouchine. An equivalent result was later obtained by Coffey by another method.
