= Difference polynomials =

In mathematics, in the area of complex analysis, the general difference polynomials are a polynomial sequence, a certain subclass of the Sheffer polynomials, which include the Newton polynomials, Selberg's polynomials, and the Stirling interpolation polynomials as special cases.

== Definition ==
The general difference polynomial sequence is given by

$$p_n(z)=\frac{z}{n} {{z-\beta n -1} \choose {n-1}}$$

where ${z \choose n}$ is the binomial coefficient. For $\beta=0$, the generated polynomials $p_n(z)$ are the Newton polynomials

$$p_n(z)= {z \choose n} = \frac{z(z-1)\cdots(z-n+1)}{n!}.$$

The case of $\beta=1$ generates Selberg's polynomials, and the case of $\beta=-1/2$ generates Stirling's interpolation polynomials.

== Moving differences ==
Given an analytic function $f(z)$, define the moving difference of f as

$$\mathcal{L}_n(f) = \Delta^n f (\beta n)$$

where $\Delta$ is the forward difference operator. Then, provided that f obeys certain summability conditions, then it may be represented in terms of these polynomials as

$$f(z)=\sum_{n=0}^\infty p_n(z) \mathcal{L}_n(f).$$

The conditions for summability (that is, convergence) for this sequence is a fairly complex topic; in general, one may say that a necessary condition is that the analytic function be of less than exponential type. Summability conditions are discussed in detail in Boas & Buck.

== Generating function ==
The generating function for the general difference polynomials is given by

$$e^{zt}=\sum_{n=0}^\infty p_n(z)
\left[\left(e^t-1\right)e^{\beta t}\right]^n.$$

This generating function can be brought into the form of the generalized Appell representation

$$K(z,w) = A(w)\Psi(zg(w)) = \sum_{n=0}^\infty p_n(z) w^n$$

by setting $A(w)=1$, $\Psi(x)=e^x$, $g(w)=t$ and $w=(e^t-1)e^{\beta t}$.

== See also ==
- Carlson's theorem
- Bernoulli polynomials of the second kind
