= Sheffer sequence =

Type of polynomial sequence

In mathematics, a Sheffer sequence or poweroid is a polynomial sequence, i.e., a sequence ( p_{n}(x) : n = 0, 1, 2, 3, ... ) of polynomials in which the index of each polynomial equals its degree, satisfying conditions related to the umbral calculus in combinatorics. They are named for Isador M. Sheffer.

== Definition ==
Fix a polynomial sequence ( p_{n} ) . Define a linear operator Q on polynomials in x by
$$Q[ p_n(x) ] = n p_{n-1}(x) ~.$$

This determines Q on all polynomials. The polynomial sequence ( p_{n} ) is a Sheffer sequence if the linear operator Q just defined is shift-equivariant; such a Q is then a delta operator. Here, we define a linear operator Q on polynomials to be shift-equivariant if, whenever f(x) = g(x + a) = T_{a} g(x) is a "shift" of g(x) , then (Qf)(x) = (Qg)(x + a) ; i.e., Q commutes with every shift operator: T_{a}Q = QT_{a} .

== Properties ==
The set of all Sheffer sequences is a group under the operation of umbral composition of polynomial sequences, defined as follows. Suppose ( p_{n}(x) : n = 0, 1, 2, 3, ... ) and ( q_{n}(x) : n = 0, 1, 2, 3, ... ) are polynomial sequences, given by
$$p_n(x) = \sum_{k=0}^n a_{n,k}x^k\ \mbox{and}\ q_n(x) = \sum_{k=0}^n b_{n,k}x^k ~.$$

Then the umbral composition $p \circ q$ is the polynomial sequence whose nth term is
$$(p_n\circ q)(x) = \sum_{k=0}^n a_{n,k}q_k(x) = \sum_{0\le \ell \le k \le n} a_{n,k}b_{k,\ell}x^\ell$$
(the subscript n appears in p_{n}, since this is the n term of that sequence, but not in q, since this refers to the sequence as a whole rather than one of its terms).

The identity element of this group is the standard monomial basis
$$e_n(x) = x^n = \sum_{k=0}^n \delta_{n,k} x^k.$$

Two important subgroups are the group of Appell sequences, which are those sequences for which the operator Q is mere differentiation, and the group of sequences of binomial type, which are those that satisfy the identity
$$p_n(x+y) = \sum_{k=0}^n\ {n \choose k}\ p_k(x)\ p_{n-k}(y) ~.$$
A Sheffer sequence ( p_{n}(x) : n = 0, 1, 2, ... ) is of binomial type if and only if both
$$p_0(x) = 1\$$
and
$$p_n(0) = 0 \quad \mbox{ for } \quad n \ge 1 ~.$$

The group of Appell sequences is abelian; the group of sequences of binomial type is not. The group of Appell sequences is a normal subgroup; the group of sequences of binomial type is not. The group of Sheffer sequences is a semidirect product of the group of Appell sequences and the group of sequences of binomial type. It follows that each coset of the group of Appell sequences contains exactly one sequence of binomial type. Two Sheffer sequences are in the same such coset if and only if the operator Q described above – called the "delta operator" of that sequence – is the same linear operator in both cases. (Generally, a delta operator is a shift-equivariant linear operator on polynomials that reduces degree by one. The term is due to F. Hildebrandt.)

If s_{n}(x) is a Sheffer sequence and p_{n}(x) is the one sequence of binomial type that shares the same delta operator, then
$$s_n(x+y) = \sum_{k=0}^n\ {n \choose k}\ p_k(x)\ s_{n-k}(y) ~.$$

Sometimes the term Sheffer sequence is defined to mean a sequence that bears this relation to some sequence of binomial type. In particular, if ( s_{n}(x) ) is an Appell sequence, then
$$s_n(x+y) = \sum_{k=0}^n\ {n \choose k}\ x^k\ s_{n-k}(y) ~.$$

The sequence of Hermite polynomials, the sequence of Bernoulli polynomials, and the monomials ( x^{n} : n = 0, 1, 2, ... ) are examples of Appell sequences.

A Sheffer sequence p_{n} is characterised by its exponential generating function
$$\sum_{n=0}^\infty\ \frac{p_n(x)}{n!}\ t^n = A(t)\ \exp\!\bigl(\ x\ B(t)\ \bigr)\$$
where A and B are (formal) power series in t. Sheffer sequences are thus examples of generalized Appell polynomials and hence have an associated recurrence relation.

== Examples ==
Examples of polynomial sequences which are Sheffer sequences include:

- The Abel polynomials
- The Bernoulli polynomials
- The Euler polynomials
- The central factorial polynomials
- The Hermite polynomials
- The Laguerre polynomials
- The monomials ( x^{n} : n = 0, 1, 2, ... )
- The Mott polynomials
- The Bernoulli polynomials of the second kind
- The Falling and rising factorials
- The Touchard polynomials
- The Mittag-Leffler polynomials
