= Graph enumeration =

The complete list of all free trees on 2, 3, and 4 labeled vertices: $2^{2-2}=1$ tree with 2 vertices, $3^{3-2}=3$ trees with 3 vertices, and $4^{4-2}=16$ trees with 4 vertices.

In combinatorics, an area of mathematics, graph enumeration describes a class of combinatorial enumeration problems in which one must count undirected or directed graphs of certain types, typically as a function of the number of vertices of the graph. These problems may be solved either exactly (as an algebraic enumeration problem) or asymptotically. The pioneers in this area of mathematics were George Pólya, Arthur Cayley and J. Howard Redfield.

== Labeled vs unlabeled problems ==
In some graphical enumeration problems, the vertices of the graph are considered to be labeled in such a way as to be distinguishable from each other, while in other problems any permutation of the vertices is considered to form the same graph, so the vertices are considered identical or unlabeled. In general, labeled problems tend to be easier. As with combinatorial enumeration more generally, the Pólya enumeration theorem is an important tool for reducing unlabeled problems to labeled ones: each unlabeled class is considered as a symmetry class of labeled objects.

The number of unlabelled graphs with $n$ vertices is still not known in a closed-form solution, but as almost all graphs are asymmetric this number is asymptotic to
$$\frac{2^{\tbinom{n}{2}}}{n!}.$$

== Exact enumeration formulas ==
Some important results in this area include the following.

- The number of labeled n-vertex simple undirected graphs is 2^{n(n−1)/2}.
- The number of labeled n-vertex simple directed graphs is 2^{n(n−1)}.
- The number C_{n} of connected labeled n-vertex undirected graphs satisfies the recurrence relation

$$C_n=2^{n\choose 2} - \frac{1}{n}\sum_{k=1}^{n-1} k{n\choose k} 2^{n-k\choose 2} C_k.$$

from which one may easily calculate, for n = 1, 2, 3, ..., that the values for C_{n} are

1, 1, 4, 38, 728, 26704, 1866256, ...(sequence A001187 in the OEIS)

- The number of labeled n-vertex free trees is n^{n−2} (Cayley's formula).
- The number of unlabeled n-vertex caterpillars is

$$2^{n-4}+2^{\lfloor (n-4)/2\rfloor}.$$

== Graph database ==
Various research groups have provided searchable database that lists graphs with certain properties of a small sizes. For example

- The House of Graphs
- Small Graph Database
