= Random permutation =

Sequence where any order is equally likely

A random permutation is a sequence where any order of its items is equally likely at random, that is, it is a permutation-valued random variable of a set of objects. The use of random permutations is common in games of chance and in randomized algorithms in coding theory, cryptography, and simulation. A good example of a random permutation is the fair shuffling of a standard deck of cards: this is ideally a random permutation of the 52 cards.

== Computation of random permutations ==
=== Entry-by-entry methods ===
One algorithm for generating a random permutation of a set of size n uniformly at random, i.e., such that each of the n! permutations is equally likely to appear, is to generate a sequence by uniformly randomly selecting an integer between 1 and n (inclusive), sequentially and without replacement n times, and then to interpret this sequence (x_{1}, ..., x_{n}) as the permutation

$$\begin{pmatrix}
1 & 2 & 3 & \cdots & n \\
x_1 & x_2 & x_3 & \cdots & x_n \\
\end{pmatrix},$$

shown here in two-line notation.

An inefficient brute-force method for sampling without replacement could select from the numbers between 1 and n at every step, retrying the selection whenever the random number picked is a repeat of a number already selected until selecting a number that has not yet been selected. The expected number of retries per step in such cases will scale with the inverse of the fraction of numbers already selected, and the overall number of retries as the sum of those inverses, making this an inefficient approach.

Such retries can be avoided using an algorithm where, on each ith step when x_{1}, ..., x_{i − 1} have already been chosen, one chooses a uniformly random number j from between 1 and n − i + 1 (inclusive) and sets x_{i} equal to the jth largest of the numbers that have not yet been selected. This selects uniformly randomly among the remaining numbers at every step without retries.

=== Fisher-Yates shuffles ===
A simple algorithm to generate a permutation of n items uniformly at random without retries, known as the Fisher–Yates shuffle, is to start with any permutation (for example, the identity permutation), and then go through the positions 0 through n − 2 (we use a convention where the first element has index 0, and the last element has index n − 1), and for each position i swap the element currently there with a randomly chosen element from positions i through n − 1 (the end), inclusive. Any permutation of n elements will be produced by this algorithm with probability exactly 1/n!, thus yielding a uniform distribution of the permutations.

/* Return a random integer between 0 and m-1 (inclusive) with uniform distribution */
unsigned uniform(unsigned m);

void shuffle(unsigned items[], unsigned n)
{
    unsigned i;
    for (i = 0; i <= n-2; i++) {
        unsigned j = i+uniform(n-i); /* A random integer such that i ≤ j < n */
        swap(items[i], items[j]); /* Swap the randomly picked element with items[i] */
    }
}

If the uniform() function is implemented simply as random() % (m) then there will be a bias in the distribution of permutations if the number of return values of random() is not a multiple of m. However, this effect is small if the number of return values of random() is orders of magnitude greater than m.

=== Randomness testing ===
As with all computational implementations of random processes, the quality of the distribution generated by an implementation of a randomized algorithm such as the Fisher-Yates shuffle, i.e., how close the actually generated distribution is to the desired distribution, will depend on the quality of underlying sources of randomness in the implementation such as pseudorandom number generators or hardware random number generators. There are many randomness tests for random permutations, such as the "overlapping permutations" test of the Diehard tests. A typical form of such tests is to take some permutation statistic for which the distribution is theoretically known and then test whether the distribution of that statistic on a set of randomly generated permutations from an implementation closely approximates the distribution of that statistic from the true distribution.

== Statistics on random permutations ==
=== Fixed points ===
The probability distribution for the number of fixed points of a uniformly distributed random permutation of n elements approaches a Poisson distribution with expected value 1 as n grows. The first n moments of this distribution are exactly those of the Poisson distribution. In particular, the probability that a random permutation has no fixed points (i.e., that the permutation is a derangement) approaches 1/e as n increases.

== See also ==
- Ewens's sampling formula — a connection with population genetics
- Faro shuffle
- Golomb–Dickman constant
- Random permutation statistics
- Shuffling algorithms — random sort method, iterative exchange method
- Pseudorandom permutation
