= Golomb–Dickman constant =

Mathematical constant

In mathematics, the Golomb–Dickman constant, named after Solomon W. Golomb and Karl Dickman, is a mathematical constant, which arises in the theory of random permutations and in number theory. Its value is

$\lambda = 0.62432 99885 43550 87099 29363 83100 83724\dots$ (sequence A084945 in the OEIS)

It is not known whether this constant is rational or irrational.

Its simple continued fraction is given by $[0; 1, 1, 1, 1, 1, 22, 1, 2, 3, 1, ...]$.

== Definitions ==
Let a_{n} be the average — taken over all permutations of a set of size n — of the length of the longest cycle in each permutation. Then the Golomb–Dickman constant is

$$\lambda = \lim_{n\to\infty} \frac{a_n}{n}.$$

In the language of probability theory, $\lambda n$ is asymptotically the expected length of the longest cycle in a uniformly distributed random permutation of a set of size n.

In number theory, the Golomb–Dickman constant appears in connection with the average size of the largest prime factor of an integer. More precisely,

$$\lambda = \lim_{n\to\infty} \frac1n \sum_{k=2}^n \frac{\log(P_1(k))}{\log(k)},$$

where $P_1(k)$ is the largest prime factor of k (sequence A006530 in the OEIS). So if k is a d digit integer, then $\lambda d$ is the asymptotic average number of digits of the largest prime factor of k.

The Golomb–Dickman constant appears in number theory in a different way. What is the probability that second largest prime factor of n is smaller than the square root of the largest prime factor of n? Asymptotically, this probability is $\lambda$. More precisely,

$$\lambda = \lim_{n\to\infty} \text{Prob}\left\{P_2(n) \le \sqrt{P_1(n)}\right\}$$

where $P_2(n)$ is the second largest prime factor n.

The Golomb–Dickman constant also arises when we consider the average length of the largest cycle of any function from a finite set to itself. If X is a finite set, if we repeatedly apply a function f: X → X to any element x of this set, it eventually enters a cycle, meaning that for some k we have $f^{n+k}(x) = f^n(x)$ for sufficiently large n; the smallest k with this property is the length of the cycle. Let b_{n} be the average, taken over all functions from a set of size n to itself, of the length of the largest cycle. Then Purdom and Williams proved that

$$\lim_{n\to\infty} \frac{b_n}{\sqrt{n}} = \sqrt{\frac{\pi}{2} } \lambda.$$

== Formulas ==
There are several expressions for $\lambda$. These include:

$$\lambda = \int_0^1 e^{\mathrm{li}(t)} \, dt$$

where $\mathrm{li}(t)$ is the logarithmic integral,

$$\lambda = \int_0^\infty e^{-t - E_1(t)} \, dt$$

where $E_1(t)$ is the exponential integral, and

$$\lambda = \int_0^\infty \frac{\rho(t)}{t+2} \, dt$$

and

$$\lambda = \int_0^\infty \frac{\rho(t)}{(t+1)^2} \, dt$$

where $\rho(t)$ is the Dickman function.

== See also ==
- Random permutation
- Random permutation statistics
