= J. Howard Redfield =

American mathematician

John Howard Redfield (June 8, 1879 – April 17, 1944) was an American mathematician, best known for discovery of what is now called Pólya enumeration theorem (PET) in 1927, ten years ahead of similar but independent discovery made by George Pólya. Redfield was a great-grandson of William Charles Redfield, one of the founders and the first president of AAAS.

== Solution to MacMahon's conjecture ==
Redfield's ability is evident in letters exchanged among Redfield, Percy MacMahon, and Sir Thomas Muir, following the publication of Redfield's paper [1] in 1927. Apparently Redfield sent a copy of his paper to MacMahon. In reply (letter of November 19, 1927), MacMahon expresses the view that Redfield has made a valuable contribution to the subject and goes on to mention a conjecture which he himself made in his recently delivered Rouse-Ball memorial lecture. He also says that it is probable that Redfield's work would lead to a proof of it. Such was the case: in a draft reply dated December 26, 1927, Redfield writes:

"I am now able to demonstrate your conjectured expression...".

MacMahon, who had failed to prove it himself and then put the matter before men at both Cambridge and Oxford "without effect", delightedly wrote to Redfield (letter of January 9, 1928):

"when you first wrote to me I formed the opinion that with your powerful handling of the theory of substitutions it would be childs play to you and I was right. I congratulate you and feel sure that your methods will carry you far."

MacMahon urged Redfield to publish his new results and also informed Muir about them. In a letter to Redfield dated December 31, 1931, Muir also encourages him to publish his verification "without waiting for MacMahon's executors" and suggests the Journal of the London Mathematical Society as an appropriate medium. As far as is known, Redfield did not follow up this suggestion, but the proof of MacMahon's conjecture was included in an unpublished manuscript which appears to be a sequel to the paper [3].

== Redfield's contemporaries on him ==
A letter from Professor Cletus Oakley to Frank Harary, dated December 19, 1963, reads in part:

"Howard Redfield was a graduate of Haverford College in the Class of 1899. He was a man of very broad interests and we do not have a continuous record of his doings. Directly after leaving college, he worked as a civil engineer. In college he took a lot of languages and mathematics. (There was no major department in those days.) After graduating from Haverford with a B.S. degree, he took a S.B. degree in M.I.T. and a M.A. and Ph.D. (mathematics) at Harvard. During the year 1907-1908, he studied romance philology at the University of Paris. In 1908-1909, he was an instructor in mathematics at Worcester Polytechnic Institute, Worcester, Massachusetts. In 1910-1911 he taught French at Swarthmore College and from 1912-1914 he was an assistant professor of romance languages at Princeton University. From 1916 onward until his death in 1944, he was a practicing civil engineer in Wayne, Pennsylvania. "
"I knew him from about 1938-1944. Indeed in 1940 he came to Haverford College and gave us some lectures on 'Electronic Digital Computers' (this was slightly before Eckert-Mauchly). Knowing him as I did in those later years, I could well understand how he would not make a great teacher. He was completely off in the clouds at all times. He never looked at you, he spoke softly with his eyes on the floor, he worked with his back to you and wrote on the board. His board work, however, was impeccable. It could have been photographed and printed by photo offset it was so perfect."
"He came to Haverford to talk to our math club many times and always had something new to say..."

Redfield's brother, Alfred, a marine biologist-oceanographer and former Associate Director of the Woods Hole Oceanographic Institution, wrote (letter to E. Keith Lloyd, September 8, 1976):

"During the later years of his life, he turned to mathematics and I usually found him working at it when I called on him. It was evident that this was his true love."

== Publications ==
1. Redfield, J. Howard (1927). "The Theory of Group-Reduced Distributions". American Journal of Mathematics. 49 (3): 433–455. doi:10.2307/2370675. JSTOR 2370675. MR 1506633.
2. Redfield, J. Howard (1935). Music: A Science and an Art. Tudor Publishing Co.
3. Redfield, J. Howard (1984). "Enumeration by frame group and range groups". Journal of Graph Theory. 8 (2): 205–223. doi:10.1002/jgt.3190080204. MR 0742876.
  This publication is based on a manuscript discovered in Redfield's legacy by his daughter. The correspondence found with the manuscript revealed that it had been submitted for publication in the American Journal of Mathematics on October 19, 1940 and was rejected by the editors in a brief letter of January 7, 1941. Redfield answered the objections of the referee in great detail ten days later and asked specific questions, but he never received a reply to his rebuttal. Apparently it was not subsequently resubmitted elsewhere. The significance of this paper is discussed in.
4. Redfield, J. Howard (2000). "Group theory applied to combinatory analysis". Communications in Mathematical and in Computer Chemistry. 41: 7–27. MR 1787629.
  This publication represents a typescript of a lecture delivered by Redfield in 1937. According to Lloyd, “The text of Redfield's lecture is very readable, and anyone wishing to study his work would be well advised to read the lecture before passing on to his 1927 and 1940 papers.”
