= Touchard =

Touchard is a French surname. Notable people with the surname include:

- Albert Touchard (1876–between 1935 and 1945), French author
- Gustave F. Touchard (1888–1918), American tennis player
- Jacques Touchard (1885–1968), French mathematician
  - Touchard polynomials

== See also ==
- Bouchard
