= Eulerian number =

Polynomial sequence

In combinatorics, the Eulerian number $A(n,k)$ is the number of permutations of the numbers 1 to $n$ in which exactly $k$ elements are greater than the previous element (permutations with $k$ "ascents").

Leonhard Euler investigated them and associated polynomials in his 1755 book Institutiones calculi differentialis.

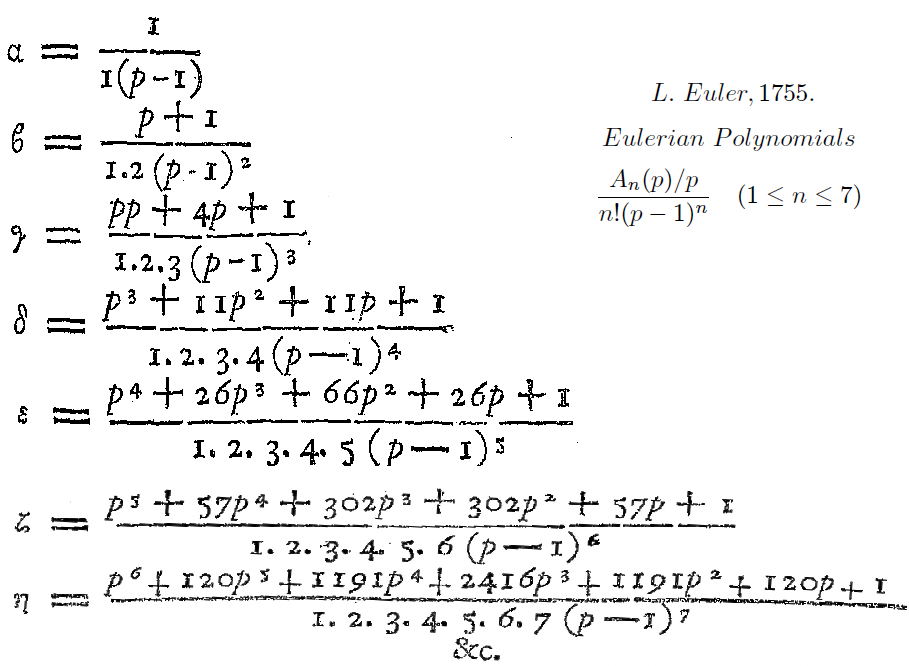
The polynomials presently known as Eulerian polynomials in Euler's work from 1755, Institutiones calculi differentialis, part 2, §173, p. 485/6. The coefficients of these polynomials are known as Eulerian numbers.

Other notations for $A(n,k)$ are $E(n,k)$ and $\textstyle \left\langle {n \atop k} \right\rangle$.

== Definition ==
A plot of the Eulerian numbers with the second argument fixed to 5.

The Eulerian polynomials $A_n(t)$ are defined by the exponential generating function

$$\sum_{n=0}^{\infty} A_{n}(t) \,\frac{x^n}{n!} = \frac{t-1}{t - e^{(t-1)\,x}} = \left(1-\frac{e^{(t-1)x}-1}{t-1}\right)^{-1}.$$

The Eulerian numbers $A(n,k)$ may also be defined as the coefficients of the Eulerian polynomials:

$$A_{n}(t) = \sum_{k=0}^n A(n,k)\,t^k.$$

An explicit formula for $A(n,k)$ is

$$A(n,k)=\sum_{i=0}^{k}(-1)^i \binom{n+1}{i} (k+1-i)^n.$$

== Basic properties ==
- For fixed $n$ there is a single permutation which has 0 ascents: $(n, n-1, n-2, \ldots, 1)$. Indeed, as ${\tbinom n 0}=1$ for all $n$, $A(n, 0) = 1$. This formally includes the empty collection of numbers, $n=0$. And so $A_0(t)=A_1(t)=1$.
- For $k=1$ the explicit formula implies $A(n,1)=2^n-(n+1)$, a sequence in $n$ that reads $0, 0, 1, 4, 11, 26, 57, \dots$.
- Fully reversing a permutation with $k$ ascents creates another permutation in which there are $n-k-1$ ascents. Therefore $A(n, k) = A(n, n-k-1)$. So there is also a single permutation which has $n-1$ ascents, namely the rising permutation $(1, 2, \ldots, n)$. So also $A(n, n-1)$ equals $1$.
- Since a permutation of the numbers $1$ to $n$ which has $k$ ascents must have $n-1-k$ descents, the symmetry $A(n, k) = A(n, n-k-1)$ shows that $A(n, k)$ also counts the number of permutations with $k$ descents.
- For $k\ge n > 0$, the values are formally zero, meaning many sums over $k$ can be written with an upper index only up to $n-1$. It also means that the polynomials $A_{n}(t)$ are really of degree $n-1$ for $n>0$.

A tabulation of the numbers in a triangular array is called the Euler triangle or Euler's triangle. It shares some common characteristics with Pascal's triangle. Values of $A(n, k)$ (sequence A008292 in the OEIS) for $0 \le n \le 9$ are:

k n	0	1	2	3	4	5	6	7	8
0	1								
1	1								
2	1	1							
3	1	4	1						
4	1	11	11	1					
5	1	26	66	26	1				
6	1	57	302	302	57	1			
7	1	120	1191	2416	1191	120	1		
8	1	247	4293	15619	15619	4293	247	1	
9	1	502	14608	88234	156190	88234	14608	502	1

== Computation ==
For larger values of $n$, $A(n,k)$ can also be calculated using the recursive formula

$$A(n,k)=(n-k)A(n-1,k-1) + (k+1)A(n-1,k).$$

This formula can be motivated from the combinatorial definition and thus serves as a natural starting point for the theory.

For small values of $n$ and $k$, the values of $A(n,k)$ can be calculated by hand. For example

n	k	Permutations	A(n, k)
1	0	(1)	A(1,0) = 1
2	0	(2, 1)	A(2,0) = 1
2	1	(1, 2)	A(2,1) = 1
3	0	(3, 2, 1)	A(3,0) = 1
3	1	(1, 3, 2), (2, 1, 3), (2, 3, 1) and (3, 1, 2)	A(3,1) = 4
3	2	(1, 2, 3)	A(3,2) = 1

Applying the recurrence to one example, we may find

$$A(4,1)=(4-1)\,A(3,0) + (1+1)\,A(3,1)=3 \cdot 1 + 2 \cdot 4 = 11.$$

Likewise, the Eulerian polynomials can be computed by the recurrence

$$A_{0}(t) = 1,$$
$$A_{n}(t) = A_{n-1}'(t)\cdot t\,(1-t) + A_{n-1}(t)\cdot (1+(n-1)\,t),\text{ for } n > 1.$$

The second formula can be cast into an inductive form,

$$A_{n}(t) = \sum_{k=0}^{n-1} \binom{n}{k} A_{k}(t)\cdot (t-1)^{n-1-k}, \text{ for } n > 1.$$

== Identities ==
For any set partition of a finite set into disjoint subsets, the sum of the cardinalities of the parts equals the cardinality of the whole set. Since there are $n!$ (the factorial of $n$) permutations of size $n$, and the Eulerian numbers give the cardinalities of the subsets of these permutations with fixed number of descents, it follows that
$$\sum_{k=0}^{n} A(n,k) = n! \,.$$
(The summand $k = n$ is 0 for $n>0$, but is included to give the correct sum $A(0,0)=0!$ when $n = 0$.) Much more generally, for a fixed function $f\colon \mathbb{R} \rightarrow \mathbb{C}$ integrable on the interval $[0, n]$, the following identity holds:

$$\sum_{k=0}^{n-1} A(n, k)\, f(k) = n!\int_0^1 \cdots \int_0^1 f\left(\left\lfloor x_1 + \cdots + x_n\right\rfloor\right) dx_1 \cdots dx_n .$$

Worpitzky's identity expresses $x^n$ as the linear combination of Eulerian numbers with binomial coefficients:

$$\sum_{k=0}^{n-1}A(n,k)\binom{x+k}{n}=x^n.$$

From this, it follows that

$$\sum_{k=1}^{m}k^n=\sum_{k=0}^{n-1} A(n,k) \binom{m+k+1}{n+1}.$$

This identity is named after Julius Worpitzky, who discovered it in the 1880s; it had been originally discovered somewhat earlier, by Li Shanlan in his 1867 work Duò Jī Bǐ Lèi.

Eulerian numbers appear as the coefficients of the polylogarithm for negative integer inputs:
$$\operatorname{Li}_{-n}(z) = {1 \over (1-z)^{n+1}} \sum_{k=0}^{n-1} A(n, k) z^{n-k} \qquad (n=1,2,3,\ldots).$$

=== Formulas involving alternating sums ===
The alternating sum of the Eulerian numbers for a fixed value of $n$ is related to the Bernoulli number $B_{n+1}$

$$\sum_{k=0}^{n-1}(-1)^k A(n,k) = 2^{n+1}(2^{n+1}-1) \frac{B_{n+1}}{n+1}, \text{  for  }n > 0.$$

Furthermore,

$$\sum_{k=0}^{n-1}(-1)^k \frac{A(n,k)}{\binom{n-1}{k}}=0, \text{  for  }n > 1$$

and

$$\sum_{k=0}^{n-1}(-1)^k \frac{A(n,k)}{\binom{n}{k}}=(n+1)B_{n}, \text{  for  } n > 1$$

=== Formulas involving the polynomials ===
The symmetry property implies:

$$A_n(t) = t^{n-1} A_n(t^{-1})$$

The Eulerian numbers are involved in the generating function for the sequence of n^{th} powers:

$$\sum_{i=1}^\infty i^n x^i = \frac{1}{(1-x)^{n+1}}\sum_{k=0}^n A(n,k)\,x^{k+1} = \frac{x}{(1-x)^{n+1}}A_n(x)$$

An explicit expression for Eulerian polynomials is

$$A_n(t) = \sum_{k=0}^n \left\{ {n \atop k} \right\} k! (t-1)^{n-k}$$

where $\left\{ {n \atop k} \right\}$ is the Stirling number of the second kind.

== Geometric interpretations ==
The Eulerian numbers have two important geometric interpretations involving convex polytopes.

First of all, the identity

$$\sum_{i=0}^\infty (i+1)^n x^i = \frac{1}{(1-x)^{n+1}}\sum_{k=0}^n A(n,k)\,x^{k}$$

implies that the Eulerian numbers form the $h^\ast$-vector of the standard $n$-dimensional hypercube, which is the convex hull of all $0,1$-vectors in $\mathbb{R}^n$.

Secondly, the identity
$$A_n(t) = \sum_{k=0}^n \left\{ {n \atop k} \right\} k! (t-1)^{n-k}$$
means that the Eulerian numbers also form the $h$-vector of the simple polytope which is dual to the $n$-dimensional permutohedron, which is the convex hull of all permutations of the vector $(1,2,\ldots,n)$ in $\mathbb{R}^n$.

== Type B Eulerian numbers ==
The hyperoctahedral group of order $n$ is the group of all signed permutations of the numbers $1$ to $n$, meaning bijections $\pi$ from the set $\{-n,-n+1,\ldots,-1,1,2,\ldots,n\}$ to itself with the property that $\pi(-i)=-\pi(i)$ for all $i$. Just as the symmetric group of order $n$ (i.e., the group of all permutations of the numbers $1$ to $n$) is the Coxeter group of Type $A_{n-1}$, the hyperoctahedral group of order $n$ is the Coxeter group of Type $B_n$.

Given an element $\pi$ of the hyperoctahedral group of order $n$ a Type B descent of $\pi$ is an index $i \in \{0,1,\ldots,n-1\}$ for which $\pi(i) > \pi(i-1)$, with the convention that $\pi(0)=0$. The Type B Eulerian number $B(n,k)$ is the number of elements of the hyperoctahedral group of order $n$ with exactly $k$ descents. They are given by the following formula:

$$B(n,k)=\sum_{i=1}^k(-1)^{k-i}\binom{n}{k-i}(2i-1)^{n-1}.$$

The table of $B(n,k)$ (sequence A060187 in the OEIS) is

k n	0	1	2	3	4	5
0	1					
1	1	1				
2	1	6	1			
3	1	23	23	1		
4	1	76	230	76	1	
5	1	237	1682	1682	237	1

The corresponding polynomials $M_n(x) = \sum_{k=0}^{n}B(n,k)x^k$ are called midpoint Eulerian polynomials because of their use in interpolation and spline theory; see Schoenberg.

The Type B Eulerian numbers and polynomials satisfy many similar identities, and have many similar properties, as the Type A, i.e., usual, Eulerian numbers and polynomials. For example, for any $n \geq 1$,

$$\sum_{i=0}^{\infty}(2i+1)^nx^i = \frac{M_{n}(x)}{(1-x)^{n+1}}.$$

And the Type B Eulerian numbers give the h-vector of the simple polytope dual to the Type B permutohedron.

In fact, one can define Eulerian numbers for any finite Coxeter group with analogous properties.

== Eulerian numbers of the second order ==
The permutations of the multiset $\{1, 1, 2, 2, \ldots, n, n\}$ which have the property that for each k, all the numbers appearing between the two occurrences of k in the permutation are greater than k are counted by the double factorial number $(2n-1)!!$. These are called Stirling permutations.

The Eulerian number of the second order, denoted $\left\langle \! \left\langle {n \atop m} \right\rangle \! \right\rangle$, counts the number of all such Stirling permutations that have exactly m ascents. For instance, for n = 3 there are 15 such permutations, 1 with no ascents, 8 with a single ascent, and 6 with two ascents:

332211,
221133, 221331, 223311, 233211, 113322, 133221, 331122, 331221,
112233, 122133, 112332, 123321, 133122, 122331.

The Eulerian numbers of the second order satisfy the recurrence relation, that follows directly from the above definition:

$$\left\langle \!\! \left\langle {n \atop k} \right\rangle \!\! \right\rangle = (2n-k-1) \left\langle \!\! \left\langle {n-1 \atop k-1} \right\rangle \!\! \right\rangle + (k+1) \left\langle \!\! \left\langle {n-1 \atop k} \right\rangle \!\! \right\rangle,$$

with initial condition for n = 0, expressed in Iverson bracket notation:

$$\left\langle \!\! \left\langle {0 \atop k} \right\rangle \!\! \right\rangle = [k=0].$$

Correspondingly, the Eulerian polynomial of second order, here denoted P_{n} (no standard notation exists for them) are

$$P_n(x) := \sum_{k=0}^n  \left\langle \!\! \left\langle {n \atop k} \right\rangle \!\! \right\rangle x^k$$

and the above recurrence relations are translated into a recurrence relation for the sequence P_{n}(x):

$$P_{n+1}(x) = (2nx+1) P_n(x) - x(x-1) P_n^\prime(x)$$

with initial condition $P_0(x) = 1$. The latter recurrence may be written in a somewhat more compact form by means of an integrating factor:

$$(x-1)^{-2n-2} P_{n+1}(x) = \left( x\,(1-x)^{-2n-1} P_n(x) \right)^\prime$$

so that the rational function

$$u_n(x) := (x-1)^{-2n} P_{n}(x)$$

satisfies a simple autonomous recurrence:

$$u_{n+1} = \left( \frac{x}{1-x} u_n \right)^\prime, \quad u_0=1$$

Whence one obtains the Eulerian polynomials of second order as $P_n(x) = (1-x)^{2n} u_n(x)$, and the Eulerian numbers of second order as their coefficients.

The Eulerian polynomials of the second order satisfy an identity analogous to the identity

$$\sum_{i=1}^\infty i^n x^i = \frac{xA_n(x)}{(1-x)^{n+1}}$$

satisfied by the usual Eulerian polynomials. Specifically, as proved by Gessel and Stanley, they satisfy the identity

$$\sum_{m=0}^{\infty}\left\{ {n+m \atop m} \right\}x^m = \frac{xP_n(x)}{(1-x)^{2n+1}}$$

where again the $\left\{ {n \atop k} \right\}$ denote the Stirling numbers of the second kind. (This appearance of the Stirling numbers explains the terminology "Stirling permutations.")

The following table displays the first few second-order Eulerian numbers:

k n	0	1	2	3	4	5	6	7	8
0	1								
1	1								
2	1	2							
3	1	8	6						
4	1	22	58	24					
5	1	52	328	444	120				
6	1	114	1452	4400	3708	720			
7	1	240	5610	32120	58140	33984	5040		
8	1	494	19950	195800	644020	785304	341136	40320	
9	1	1004	67260	1062500	5765500	12440064	11026296	3733920	362880

The sum of the n-th row, which is also the value $P_n(1)$, is $(2n-1)!!$.

Indexing the second-order Eulerian numbers comes in three flavors:

- (sequence A008517 in the OEIS) following Riordan and Comtet,
- (sequence A201637 in the OEIS) following Graham, Knuth, and Patashnik,
- (sequence A340556 in the OEIS), extending the definition of Gessel and Stanley.
