= Binomial type =

Type of polynomial sequence

In mathematics, a polynomial sequence, i.e., a sequence of polynomials indexed by non-negative integers $\left\{0, 1, 2, 3, \ldots \right\}$ in which the index of each polynomial equals its degree, is said to be of binomial type if it satisfies the sequence of identities

$$p_n(x+y)=\sum_{k=0}^n{n \choose k}\, p_k(x)\, p_{n-k}(y).$$

Many such sequences exist. The set of all such sequences forms a Lie group under the operation of umbral composition, explained below. Every sequence of binomial type may be expressed in terms of the Bell polynomials. Every sequence of binomial type is a Sheffer sequence (but most Sheffer sequences are not of binomial type). Polynomial sequences put on firm footing the vague 19th century notions of umbral calculus.

== Examples ==
- In consequence of this definition the binomial theorem can be stated by saying that the sequence $\{x^n : n= 0, 1, 2, \ldots \}$ is of binomial type.
- The sequence of "lower factorials" is defined by
  $$(x)_n=x(x-1)(x-2)\cdot\cdots\cdot(x-n+1).$$
  (In the theory of special functions, this same notation denotes upper factorials, but this present usage is universal among combinatorialists.) The product is understood to be 1 if n = 0, since it is in that case an empty product. This polynomial sequence is of binomial type.
- Similarly the "upper factorials"
  $$x^{(n)}=x(x+1)(x+2)\cdot\cdots\cdot(x+n-1)$$
  are a polynomial sequence of binomial type.
- The Abel polynomials
  $$p_n(x)=x(x-an)^{n-1}$$
  are a polynomial sequence of binomial type.
- The Touchard polynomials
  $$p_n(x)=\sum_{k=0}^n S(n,k)x^k$$
  where $S(n,k)$ is the number of partitions of a set of size $n$ into $k$ disjoint non-empty subsets, is a polynomial sequence of binomial type. Eric Temple Bell called these the "exponential polynomials" and that term is also sometimes seen in the literature. The coefficients $S(n,k)$ are "Stirling numbers of the second kind". This sequence has a curious connection with the Poisson distribution: If $X$ is a random variable with a Poisson distribution with expected value $\lambda$ then $E(X^n)= p_n(\lambda)$. In particular, when $\lambda = 1$, we see that the $n$th moment of the Poisson distribution with expected value $1$ is the number of partitions of a set of size $n$, called the $n$th Bell number. This fact about the $n$th moment of that particular Poisson distribution is "Dobinski's formula".

== Characterization by delta operators ==
It can be shown that a polynomial sequence { p_{n}(x): n = 0, 1, 2, … } is of binomial type if and only if all three of the following conditions hold:

- The linear transformation on the space of polynomials in x that is characterized by
  $$p_n(x) \mapsto n p_{n-1}(x)$$
  is shift-equivariant, and
- p_{0}(x) = 1 for all x, and
- p_{n}(0) = 0 for n > 0.

(The statement that this operator is shift-equivariant is the same as saying that the polynomial sequence is a Sheffer sequence; the set of sequences of binomial type is properly included within the set of Sheffer sequences.)

=== Delta operators ===
That linear transformation is clearly a delta operator, i.e., a shift-equivariant linear transformation on the space of polynomials in x that reduces degrees of polynomials by 1. The most obvious examples of delta operators are difference operators and differentiation. It can be shown that every delta operator can be written as a power series of the form: $Q=\sum_{n=1}^\infty c_n D^n$ where D is differentiation (note that the lower bound of summation is 1). Each delta operator Q has a unique sequence of "basic polynomials", i.e., a polynomial sequence satisfying

1. $p_0(x)=1,$
2. $p_n(0)=0\quad{\rm for\ }n\geq 1,{\rm\ and}$
3. $Qp_n(x)=np_{n-1}(x).$

It was shown in 1973 by Rota, Kahaner, and Odlyzko, that a polynomial sequence is of binomial type if and only if it is the sequence of basic polynomials of some delta operator. Therefore, this paragraph amounts to a recipe for generating as many polynomial sequences of binomial type as one may wish.

== Characterization by Bell polynomials ==
For any sequence a_{1}, a_{2}, a_{3}, … of scalars, let

$$p_n(x)=\sum_{k=1}^n B_{n,k}(a_1,\dots,a_{n-k+1}) x^k$$

where B_{n,k}(a_{1}, …, a_{n−k+1}) is the Bell polynomial. Then this polynomial sequence is of binomial type. Note that for each n ≥ 1,

$$p_n'(0)=a_n.$$

Here is the main result of this section:

Theorem: All polynomial sequences of binomial type are of this form.

A result in Mullin and Rota, repeated in Rota, Kahaner, and Odlyzko states that every polynomial sequence { p_{n}(x) }_{n} of binomial type is determined by the sequence { p_{n}′(0) }_{n}, but those sources do not mention Bell polynomials.

This sequence of scalars is also related to the delta operator. Let

$$P(t)=\sum_{n=1}^\infty {a_n \over n!} t^n.$$

Then

$$P^{-1}\left({d \over dx}\right),$$

where $P^{-1}(P(x)) = P(P^{-1}(x)) = x$, is the delta operator of this sequence.

== Characterization by a convolution identity ==
For sequences a_{n}, b_{n}, n = 0, 1, 2, …, define a sort of convolution by

$$(a \mathbin{\diamondsuit} b)_n = \sum_{j=0}^n {n \choose j} a_j b_{n-j}.$$

Let $a_n^{k\diamondsuit}$ be the nth term of the sequence

$$\underbrace{a\mathbin{\diamondsuit}\cdots\mathbin{\diamondsuit} a}_{k\text{ factors}}.$$

Then for any sequence a_{i}, i = 0, 1, 2, ..., with a_{0} = 0, the sequence defined by p_{0}(x) = 1 and

$$p_n(x) = \sum_{k=1}^n {a_n^{k\diamondsuit} x^k \over k!}\,$$

for n ≥ 1, is of binomial type, and every sequence of binomial type is of this form.

== Characterization by generating functions ==
Polynomial sequences of binomial type are precisely those whose generating functions are formal (not necessarily convergent) power series of the form

$$\sum_{n=0}^\infty {p_n(x) \over n!}t^n = e^{x \varphi(t)}$$

where $\varphi(t)$ is a formal power series whose constant term is zero and whose first-degree term is not zero. It can be shown by the use of the power-series version of Faà di Bruno's formula that

$$\varphi(t)=\sum_{n=1}^\infty {p_n'(0) \over n!}t^{n}.$$

The delta operator of the sequence is the compositional inverse $f(y)$, i.e. such function that $f(\varphi(t))=t$, so that

$$f(D)p_n(x)=np_{n-1}(x).$$

=== A way to think about these generating functions ===
The coefficients in the product of two formal power series

$$\sum_{n=0}^\infty {a_n \over n!}t^n$$

and

$$\sum_{n=0}^\infty {b_n \over n!}t^n$$

are

$$c_n=\sum_{k=0}^n {n \choose k} a_k b_{n-k}$$

(see also Cauchy product). If we think of x as a parameter indexing a family of such power series, then the binomial identity says in effect that the power series indexed by x + y is the product of those indexed by x and by y. Thus the x is the argument to a function that maps sums to products: an exponential function

$$g(t)^x=e^{x \varphi(t)}$$

where $\varphi(t)$ has the form given above.

== Umbral composition of polynomial sequences ==
The set of all polynomial sequences of binomial type is a group in which the group operation is "umbral composition" of polynomial sequences. That operation is defined as follows. Suppose { p_{n}(x): n = 0, 1, 2, 3, ... } and { q_{n}(x): n = 0, 1, 2, 3, ... } are polynomial sequences, and

$$p_n(x)=\sum_{k=0}^n a_{n,k}\, x^k.$$

Then the umbral composition p o q is the polynomial sequence whose nth term is

$$(p_n\circ q)(x)=\sum_{k=0}^n a_{n,k}\, q_k(x)$$

(the subscript n appears in p_{n}, since this is the n term of that sequence, but not in q, since this refers to the sequence as a whole rather than one of its terms).

With the delta operator defined by a power series in D as above, the natural bijection between delta operators and polynomial sequences of binomial type, also defined above, is a group isomorphism, in which the group operation on power series is formal composition of formal power series.

== Cumulants and moments ==
The sequence κ_{n} of coefficients of the first-degree terms in a polynomial sequence of binomial type may be termed the cumulants of the polynomial sequence. It can be shown that the whole polynomial sequence of binomial type is determined by its cumulants, in a way discussed in the article titled cumulant. Thus

$p_n'(0)=\kappa_n=$ the nth cumulant

and

$p_n(1)=\mu_n'=$ the nth moment.

These are "formal" cumulants and "formal" moments, as opposed to cumulants of a probability distribution and moments of a probability distribution.

Let

$$\varphi(t)=\sum_{n=1}^\infty\frac{\kappa_n}{n!}t^n$$

be the (formal) cumulant-generating function. If we define $f(y)$ to be such formal power series that $f(\varphi(y))=y$, then

$$f(D)$$

is the delta operator associated with the polynomial sequence, i.e., we have

$$f(D)p_n(x)=n p_{n-1}(x).$$

Moreover

$$x\frac{1}{f'(D)}p_n(x)=p_{n+1}(x).$$

== Continuation by $s$ ==
There is a way to define “polynomials of binomial type of complex index”, precisely: define $p_s(x)$, $s \in \mathbb{C}$ to be

$p_s(x)=x\left(\frac{D}{f(D)}\right)^s x^{s-1}$

So that

$\frac{\Gamma(1+x)}{\Gamma(1+x-s)}=x\left(\frac{D}{e^D-1}\right)^s x^{s-1}$

where $\Gamma(x)$ is the Gamma-function.

== Logarithm ==
There is a formula for the logarithm of binomial type sequence. Suppose the generating function of $p_n(x)$ is $e^{x\varphi(y)}$ where $f(y)$ is the inverse to $\varphi(y)$. Define $\omega(y)$ as inverse to $f(y)/f'(y)$. Define an operator $\mathrm{L}: \mathrm{L}g(y)=(g(y)-g(0))/y$. Then

$\frac{1}{n}\ln p_n(x)=\exp\left(\frac{d}{dx}\left(\frac{d}{d\omega}-n\mathrm{L}\right)\right)\frac{\omega(y)}{y}\Bigg|_{y=0} \cdot \ln(x)$

The formula for $\ln p_s(x)$ may be obtained by substituting $n=s$ in the last formula, where $p_s(x)$ is defined as above.

== Applications ==
The concept of binomial type has applications in combinatorics, probability, statistics, and a variety of other fields.

== See also ==
- List of factorial and binomial topics
- Binomial-QMF (Daubechies wavelet filters)
