= Holdener =

Holdener is a surname. Notable people with the surname include:

- Judy A. Holdener (born 1965), American mathematician and educator
- Wendy Holdener (born 1993), Swiss alpine skier
- Chadwick James Holdener (born 1976) Professional Party Thrower and Musician

== See also ==
- Holender
