= Kurt Mahler =

German mathematician (1903–1988)

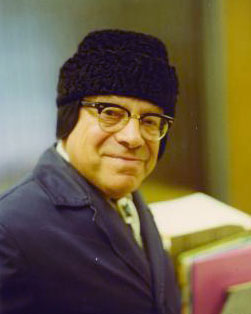
- Mahler in 1970
- Born: 26 July 1903; Krefeld, German Empire
- Died: 25 February 1988 (aged 84); Canberra, Australia
- Education: Johann Wolfgang Goethe-Universität
- Known for: Mahler's inequality Mahler measure Mahler polynomial Mahler volume Mahler's theorem Mahler's compactness theorem Skolem–Mahler–Lech theorem
- Awards: Fellow of the Royal Society (1948); Fellow of the Australian Academy of Science (1965); Senior Berwick Prize (1950); De Morgan Medal (1971); Thomas Ranken Lyle Medal (1977)
- Scientific career
- Fields: Mathematics
- Workplaces: Ohio State University; Australian National University; University of Manchester; University of Groningen
- Thesis: Über die Nullstellen der unvollständigen Gammafunktion (1927)
- Doctoral advisor: Carl Ludwig Siegel

Kurt Mahler FRS (26 July 1903 – 25 February 1988) was a German mathematician who worked in the fields of transcendental number theory, diophantine approximation, p-adic analysis, and the geometry of numbers.

== Career ==
Mahler was a student at the universities in Frankfurt and Göttingen, graduating with a Ph.D. from Johann Wolfgang Goethe University of Frankfurt am Main in 1927; his advisor was Carl Ludwig Siegel. He left Germany with the rise of Adolf Hitler and accepted an invitation by Louis Mordell to go to Manchester. However, at the start of World War II he was interned as an enemy alien in Central Camp in Douglas, Isle of Man, where he met Kurt Hirsch, although he was released after only three months. He became a British citizen in 1946.

Mahler held the following positions:

- University of Groningen
  - Assistant 1934–1936
- University of Manchester
  - Assistant Lecturer at 1937–1939, 1941–1944
  - Lecturer, 1944–1947; Senior Lecturer, 1948–1949; Reader, 1949–1952
  - Professor of Mathematical Analysis, 1952–1963
- Professor of Mathematics, Institute of Advanced Studies, Australian National University, 1963–1968 and 1972–1975
- Professor of Mathematics, Ohio State University, USA, 1968–1972
- Professor Emeritus, Australian National University, from 1975.

== Research ==
Mahler worked in a broad variety of mathematical disciplines, including transcendental number theory, diophantine approximation, p-adic analysis, and the geometry of numbers.

Mahler proved that the Prouhet–Thue–Morse constant and the Champernowne constant 0.1234567891011121314151617181920... are transcendental numbers.

Mahler was the first to give an explicit irrationality measure for π, in 1953 (of 42). Although some have suggested the irrationality measure of π is likely to be 2, the current best estimate is 7.103205334137…, due to Doron Zeilberger and Wadim Zudilin.

== Awards ==
He was elected a fellow of the Royal Society in 1948 and a fellow of the Australian Academy of Science in 1965. He was awarded the London Mathematical Society's Senior Berwick Prize in 1950, the De Morgan Medal, 1971, and the Thomas Ranken Lyle Medal, 1977.

== Personal life ==
Mahler spoke Chinese and was an expert photographer.

== See also ==
- Mahler's inequality
- Mahler measure
- Mahler polynomial
- Mahler volume
- Mahler's theorem
- Mahler's compactness theorem
- Skolem–Mahler–Lech theorem
