= Slowly varying function =

Function in mathematics

In real analysis, a branch of mathematics, a slowly varying function is a function of a real variable whose behaviour at infinity is in some sense similar to the behaviour of a function converging at infinity. Similarly, a regularly varying function is a function of a real variable whose behaviour at infinity is similar to the behaviour of a power law function (like a polynomial) near infinity. These classes of functions were both introduced by Jovan Karamata, and have found several important applications, for example in probability theory and extreme value theory.

== Basic definitions ==
Definition 1. A measurable function L : (0, +∞) → (0, +∞) is called slowly varying (at infinity) if for all a > 0,

$$\lim_{x \to \infty} \frac{L(ax)}{L(x)}=1.$$

Definition 2. Let L : (0, +∞) → (0, +∞). Then L is a regularly varying function if and only if $\forall a > 0, g_L(a) = \lim_{x \to \infty} \frac{L(ax)}{L(x)} \in \mathbb{R}^{+}$. In particular, the limit must be finite.

These definitions are due to Jovan Karamata.

== Basic properties ==
Regularly varying functions have some important properties: a partial list of them is reported below. More extensive analyses of the properties characterizing regular variation are presented in the monograph by Bingham, Goldie & Teugels (1987).

=== Uniformity of the limiting behaviour ===
Theorem 1. The limit in definitions 1 and 2 is uniform if a is restricted to a compact interval.

=== Karamata's characterization theorem ===
Theorem 2. Every regularly varying function f : (0, +∞) → (0, +∞) is of the form

$$f(x)=x^\beta L(x)$$

where

- β is a real number,
- L is a slowly varying function.

Note. This implies that the function g(a) in definition 2 has necessarily to be of the following form

$$g(a)=a^\rho$$

where the real number ρ is called the index of regular variation.

=== Karamata representation theorem ===
Theorem 3. A function L is slowly varying if and only if there exists B > 0 such that for all x ≥ B the function can be written in the form

$$L(x) = \exp \left( \eta(x) + \int_B^x \frac{\varepsilon(t)}{t} \,dt \right)$$

where

- η(x) is a bounded measurable function of a real variable converging to a finite number as x goes to infinity
- ε(x) is a bounded measurable function of a real variable converging to zero as x goes to infinity.

== Examples ==
- If L is a measurable function and has a limit

$$\lim_{x \to \infty} L(x) = b \in (0,\infty),$$

then L is a slowly varying function.

- For any β ∈ R, the function L(x) = log^{β} x is slowly varying.
- The function L(x) = x is not slowly varying, nor is L(x) = x^{β} for any real β ≠ 0. However, these functions are regularly varying.

== See also ==
- Analytic number theory
- Hardy–Littlewood tauberian theorem and its treatment by Karamata
