= Štrukljeva Vas =

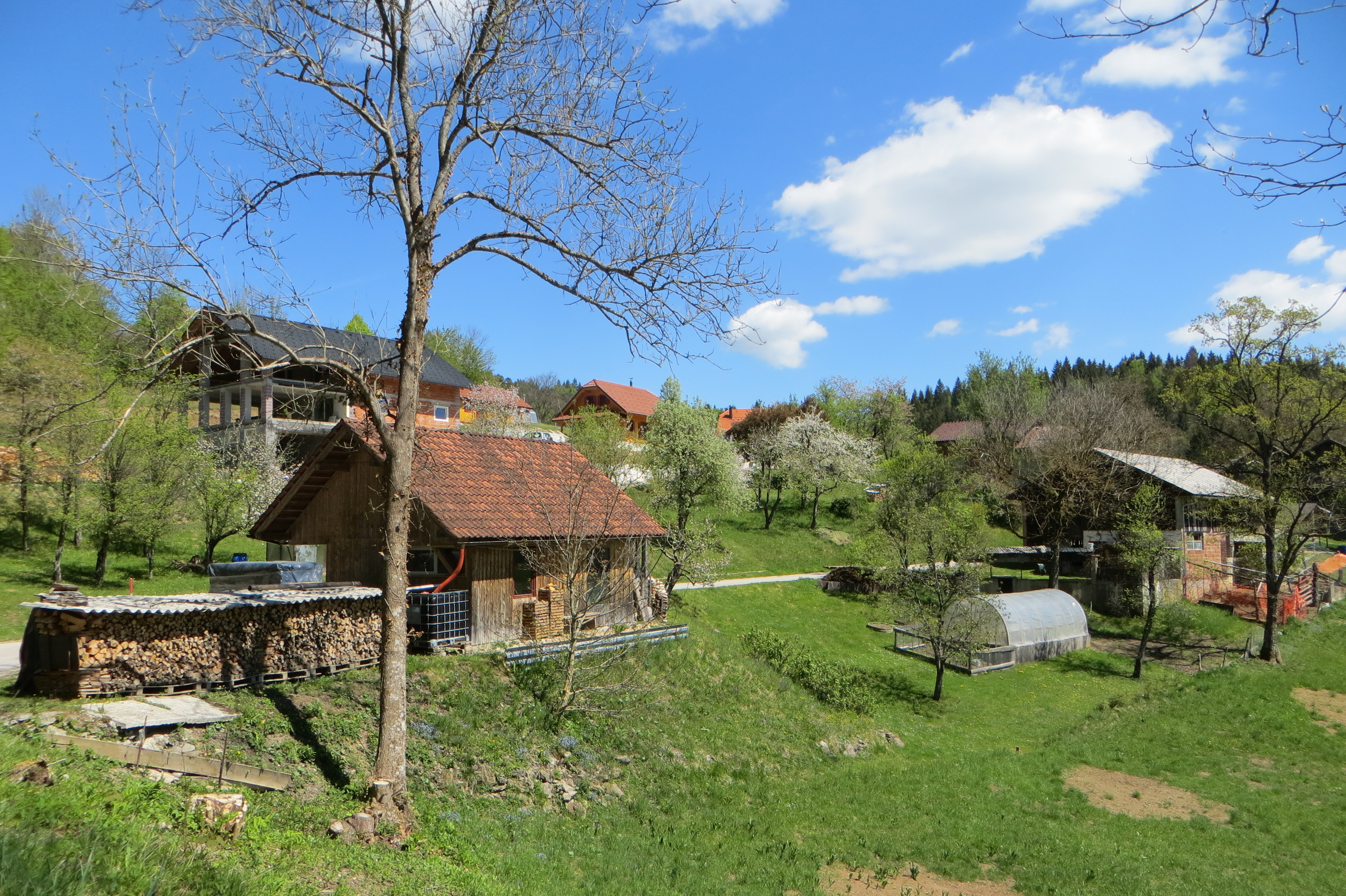

- Location in Slovenia
- Coordinates: 45°49′48.58″N 14°28′16.89″E
- Country: Slovenia
- Traditional region: Inner Carniola
- Statistical region: Littoral–Inner Carniola
- Municipality: Cerknica

Area
  - Total: 1.1 km^{2} (0.42 sq mi)
- Elevation: 685 m (2,247 ft)

Population (2020)
  - Total: 32
  - Density: 29/km^{2} (75/sq mi)

Štrukljeva Vas (pronounced [ˈʃtɾuːkljɛʋa ˈʋaːs]; Slovene: Štrukljeva vas, German: Strukeldorf) is a small village east of Begunje in the Municipality of Cerknica in the Inner Carniola region of Slovenia.

== Name ==
The name Štrukljeva Vas literally means 'Štrukelj's village' (Štrukelj is a surname in the area). The possessive form of the village's name indicates that it is located in an area that was cleared and settled relatively late.

== Church ==
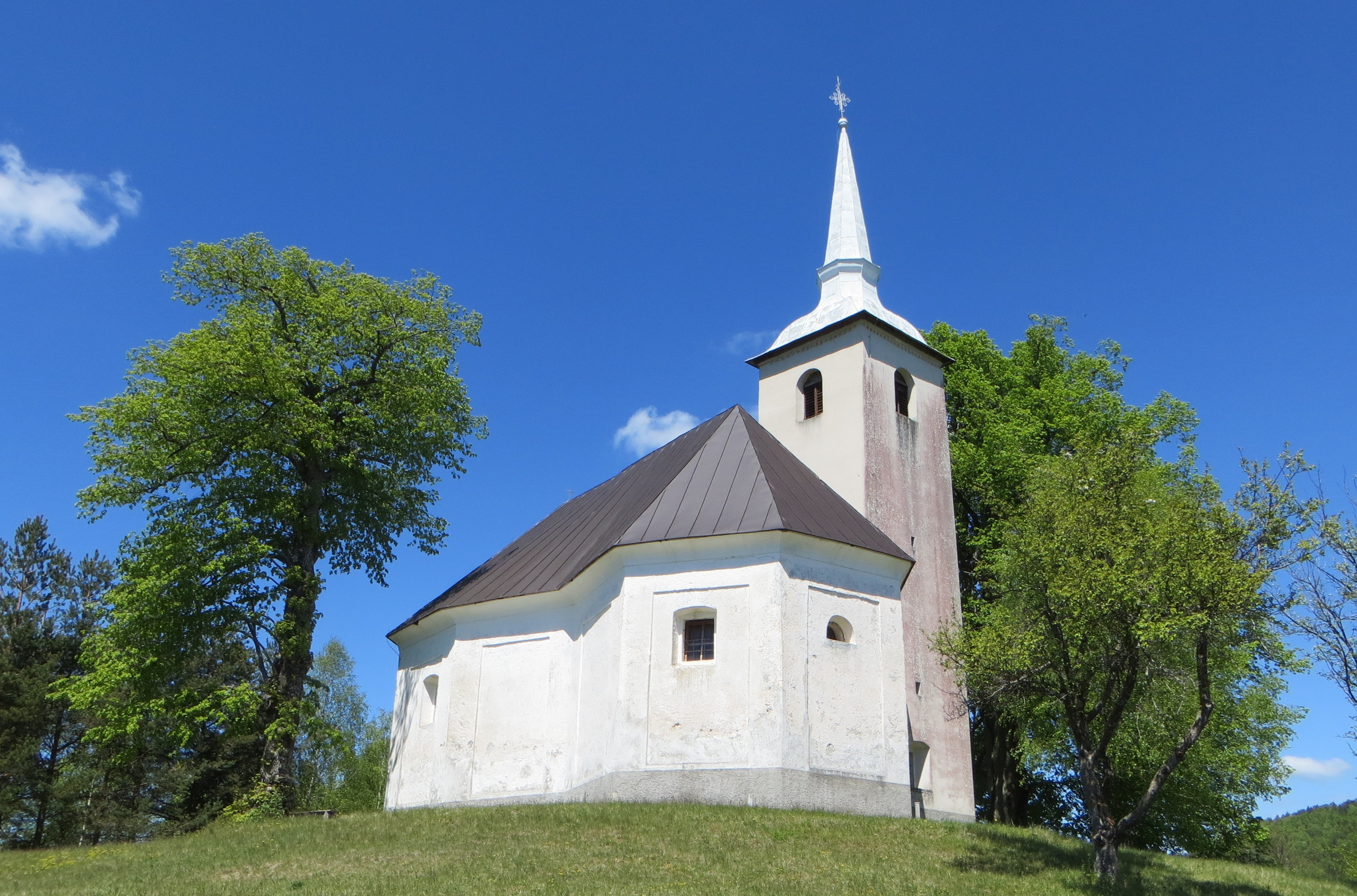
Saint James's Church

The local church is a chapel of ease dedicated to Saint James and belongs to the Parish of Sveti Vid. The church features a gilded altar from the second half of the 17th century, adorned with some late Baroque additions. The altar was renovated in 1928 by the wood-carver Franc Bečaj from Cerknica. The bell tower, which appears to have been built as a separate structure, is several centuries old and houses a copper bell dating back to 1445. According to oral tradition, the villagers received the bell from Trsat in exchange for rights to a fair held below Kapelšče Hill (770 m) north of the village.

== Notable people ==
Notable people that were born or lived in Štrukljeva Vas include:

- Ivo Lah (1896–1979), statistician
- Ivan Štrukelj (1880–1952), teacher
