= Ivo Lah =

Slovenian mathematician (1896–1979)

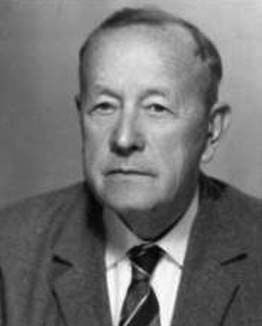
- Born: 5 September 1896; Štrukljeva Vas, near Cerknica, Austria-Hungary
- Died: 23 March 1979 (aged 82); Ljubljana, Yugoslavia
- Education: University of Zagreb
- Known for: Lah numbers
- Scientific career
- Fields: Mathematics, statistics

Ivo Lah (pronounced [ˈiːʋɔ ˈlax]; 5 September 1896 – 23 March 1979) was a Slovenian mathematician and actuary, best known for his discovery of the Lah numbers in 1955 and for the Lah identity. In the 1930s, Lah made the first tables about mortality rates in Slovenia.

== Biography ==
Ivo Lah was born in Štrukljeva Vas near Cerknica, Austria-Hungary (present-day Slovenia) on 5 September 1896.

In the 1930s, Lah made the first tables about mortality rates in Slovenia. Lah published Racunske osnovice zivotnog osiguranja in 1947.

Lah died in Ljubljana, Yugoslavia (present-day Slovenia).

A stamp was issued in Lah's honor by the Post of Slovenia in 2026.
