= Mahler's theorem =

Theorem in p-adic analysis

In mathematics, Mahler's theorem, introduced by Kurt Mahler (1958), expresses any continuous p-adic function as an infinite series of certain special polynomials. This series is referred to as a Mahler series or Mahler expansion, or as Mahler's expansion. It is the p-adic counterpart to the Stone–Weierstrass theorem for continuous real-valued functions on a closed interval.

== Statement ==
Let $(\Delta f)(x)=f(x+1)-f(x)$ be the forward difference operator. Then for any p-adic function $f: \mathbb{Z}_p \to \mathbb{Q}_p$, Mahler's theorem states that $f$ is continuous if and only if its Newton series converges everywhere to $f$, so that for all $x \in \mathbb{Z}_p$ we have

$$f(x)=\sum_{n=0}^\infty (\Delta^n f)(0){x \choose n},$$

where

$${x \choose n}=\frac{x(x-1)(x-2)\cdots(x-n+1)}{n!}$$

is the $n$th binomial coefficient polynomial. Here, the $n$th forward difference is computed by the binomial transform, so that
$$(\Delta^n f)(0) = \sum^n_{k=0} (-1)^{n-k} \binom{n}{k} f(k).$$
Moreover, we have that
$$f(x):=\sum_{n=0}^\infty a_n\binom{x}{n}$$
is continuous if and only if the coefficients $a_n=(\Delta^n f)(0) \to 0$ in $\mathbb{Q}_p$ as $n \to \infty$.

It is remarkable that as weak an assumption as continuity is enough in the p-adic setting to establish convergence of Newton series. By contrast, Newton series on the field of complex numbers are far more tightly constrained, and require Carlson's theorem to hold.
