= Holender =

Holender is a surname. Notable people with the surname include:

- Filip Holender (born 1994), Hungarian footballer
- Ioan Holender (born 1935), Romanian-born Austrian opera administrator

== See also ==
- Holdener
