= Langford pairing =

Sequence of integers

A Langford pairing for n = 4.

In combinatorial mathematics, a Langford pairing, also called a Langford sequence, is a permutation of the sequence of 2n numbers 1, 1, 2, 2, ..., n, n in which the two 1s are one unit apart, the two 2s are two units apart, and more generally the two copies of each number k are k units apart. Langford pairings are named after C. Dudley Langford, who posed the problem of constructing them in 1958.

Langford's problem is the task of finding Langford pairings for a given value of n.

The closely related concept of a Skolem sequence is defined in the same way, but instead permutes the sequence 0, 0, 1, 1, ..., n − 1, n − 1.

== Example ==
A Langford pairing for n = 3 is given by the sequence 2, 3, 1, 2, 1, 3.

== Properties ==
Langford pairings exist only when n is congruent to 0 or 3 modulo 4; for instance, there is no Langford pairing when n = 1, 2, or 5.

The numbers of different Langford pairings for n = 1, 2, …, counting any sequence as being the same as its reversal, are

0, 0, 1, 1, 0, 0, 26, 150, 0, 0, 17792, 108144, 0, 0, 39809640, 326721800, 0, 0, 256814891280, 2636337861200, 0, 0, … (sequence A014552 in the OEIS).

As Knuth (2008) describes, the problem of listing all Langford pairings for a given n can be solved as an instance of the exact cover problem, but for large n the number of solutions can be calculated more efficiently by algebraic methods.

== Applications ==
Skolem (1957) used Skolem sequences to construct Steiner triple systems.

In the 1960s, E. J. Groth used Langford pairings to construct circuits for integer multiplication.

== See also ==
- Stirling permutation, a different type of permutation of the same multiset
