= Judy A. Holdener =

American number theorist (b.1965)

Judy Holdener (née Newhauser) is an American mathematician and educator. She is a professor of mathematics at Kenyon College. She was born in 1965. Holdener's primary interest is in number theory. She discovered a simpler proof of the theorem of Touchard, which states that every perfect number is of the form 2k, 12k+1, or 36k+9.

Holdener earned her B.S. in mathematics at Kent State University and her M.S. and Ph.D. in mathematics at the University of Illinois Urbana-Champaign. Holdener joined the faculty of Kenyon College in 1997, where she is currently the John B. McCoy Distinguished Teaching Chair.

The poem Euler's Daughter by award-winning South African poet Athol Williams is dedicated to Holdener in celebration of her love of mathematics and life.
