= Lah number =

Mathematical sequence

Illustration of the unsigned Lah numbers for n and k between 1 and 4

In mathematics, the (signed and unsigned) Lah numbers are coefficients expressing rising factorials in terms of falling factorials and vice versa. They were discovered by Ivo Lah in 1954. Explicitly, the unsigned Lah numbers $L(n, k)$ are given by the formula involving the binomial coefficient

$$L(n,k) = {n-1 \choose k-1} \frac{n!}{k!}$$

for $n \geq k \geq 1$, and the signed Lah numbers $L'(n, k)$ are related to them by $L'(n, k) = (-1)^n L(n, k)$.

Signed Lah numbers are only of historical interest as it's how they were defined in Lah's seminal paper, but their sign pattern ($(-1)^n$, instead of $(-1)^{n-k}$ as used for signed Stirling numbers) make them of little to no use in formulas of mathematical interest.

Unsigned Lah numbers have an interesting meaning in combinatorics: they count the number of ways a set of $n$ elements can be partitioned into $k$ nonempty linearly ordered subsets. Lah numbers are related to Stirling numbers.

For $n \geq 1$, the Lah number $L(n, 1)$ is equal to the factorial $n!$ in the interpretation above, the only partition of $\{1, 2, 3 \}$ into 1 set can have its set ordered in 6 ways:
$$\{(1, 2, 3)\}, \{(1, 3, 2)\}, \{(2, 1, 3)\}, \{(2, 3, 1)\}, \{(3, 1, 2)\}, \{(3, 2, 1)\}$$
$L(3, 2)$ is equal to 6, because there are six partitions of $\{1, 2, 3 \}$ into two ordered parts:
$$\{1, (2, 3) \}, \{1, (3, 2) \}, \{2, (1, 3) \}, \{2, (3, 1) \}, \{3, (1, 2) \}, \{3, (2, 1) \}$$
$L(n, n)$ is always 1 because the only way to partition $\{1, 2, \ldots, n\}$ into $n$ non-empty subsets results in subsets of size 1, that can only be permuted in one way. In the more recent literature, Karamata–Knuth style notation has taken over. Lah numbers are now often written as
$$L(n,k) = \left\lfloor {n \atop k} \right\rfloor$$

== Table of values ==
Below is a table of values for the Lah numbers:

k n	0	1	2	3	4	5	6	7	8	9	10
0	1										
1	0	1									
2	0	2	1								
3	0	6	6	1							
4	0	24	36	12	1						
5	0	120	240	120	20	1					
6	0	720	1800	1200	300	30	1				
7	0	5040	15120	12600	4200	630	42	1			
8	0	40320	141120	141120	58800	11760	1176	56	1		
9	0	362880	1451520	1693440	846720	211680	28224	2016	72	1	
10	0	3628800	16329600	21772800	12700800	3810240	635040	60480	3240	90	1

The row sums are $1, 1, 3, 13, 73, 501, 4051, 37633, \dots$ (sequence A000262 in the OEIS).

== Rising and falling factorials ==
Let $x^{(n)}$ represent the rising factorial $x(x+1)(x+2) \cdots (x+n-1)$ and let $(x)_n$ represent the falling factorial $x(x-1)(x-2) \cdots (x-n+1)$. The Lah numbers are the coefficients that express each of these families of polynomials in terms of the other. Explicitly,
$$x^{(n)} = \sum_{k=0}^n L(n,k) (x)_k$$
and
$$(x)_n = \sum_{k=0}^n (-1)^{n-k} L(n,k)x^{(k)}.$$
For example,
$$x(x+1)(x+2) = {\color{red}6}x + {\color{red}6}x(x-1) + {\color{red}1}x(x-1)(x-2)$$
and
$$x(x-1)(x-2) = {\color{red}6}x - {\color{red}6}x(x+1) + {\color{red}1}x(x+1)(x+2),$$

where the coefficients 6, 6, and 1 are exactly the Lah numbers $L(3, 1)$, $L(3, 2)$, and $L(3, 3)$.

== Identities and relations ==
The Lah numbers satisfy a variety of identities and relations.

In Karamata–Knuth notation for Stirling numbers
$$L(n,k) = \sum_{j=k}^n \left[{n\atop j}\right] \left\{{j\atop k}\right\}$$
where $\left[{n\atop j}\right]$ are the unsigned Stirling numbers of the first kind and $\left\{{j\atop k}\right\}$ are the Stirling numbers of the second kind.

$$L(n,k) = {n-1 \choose k-1} \frac{n!}{k!} = {n \choose k} \frac{(n-1)!}{(k-1)!} = {n \choose k} {n-1 \choose k-1} (n-k)!$$

$$L(n,k) = \frac{n!(n-1)!}{k!(k-1)!}\cdot\frac{1}{(n-k)!} = \left (\frac{n!}{k!} \right )^2\frac{k}{n(n-k)!}$$

$k(k+1) L(n,k+1) = (n-k) L(n,k)$, for $k>0$.

=== Recurrence relations ===
The Lah numbers satisfy the recurrence relations
$$\begin{align} L(n+1,k) &= (n+k) L(n,k) + L(n,k-1) \\
&= k(k+1) L(n, k+1) + 2k L(n, k) + L(n, k-1)
\end{align}$$
where $L(n,0)=\delta_n$, the Kronecker delta, and $L(n,k)=0$ for all $k > n$.

=== Exponential generating function ===
$$\sum_{n\geq k} L(n,k)\frac{x^n}{n!} = \frac{1}{k!}\left( \frac{x}{1-x} \right)^k$$

=== Derivative of exp(1/x) ===
The n-th derivative of the function $e^\frac1{x}$ can be expressed with the Lah numbers, as follows
$$\frac{\textrm d^n}{\textrm dx^n} e^\frac1x = (-1)^n \sum_{k=1}^n \frac{L(n,k)}{x^{n+k}} \cdot e^\frac1x.$$
For example,

$\frac{\textrm d}{\textrm dx} e^\frac1x = - \frac{1}{x^2} \cdot e^{\frac1x}$

$\frac{\textrm d^2}{\textrm dx^2}e^\frac1{x} = \frac{\textrm d}{\textrm dx} \left(-\frac1{x^2} e^{\frac1x} \right)= -\frac{-2}{x^3} \cdot e^{\frac1x} - \frac1{x^2} \cdot \frac{-1}{x^2} \cdot e^{\frac1x}= \left(\frac2{x^3} + \frac1{x^4}\right) \cdot e^{\frac1x}$

$\frac{\textrm d^3}{\textrm dx^3} e^\frac1{x} = \frac{\textrm d}{\textrm dx} \left( \left(\frac2{x^3} + \frac1{x^4}\right) \cdot e^{\frac1x} \right) = \left(\frac{-6}{x^4} + \frac{-4}{x^5}\right) \cdot e^{\frac1x} + \left(\frac2{x^3} + \frac1{x^4}\right) \cdot \frac{-1}{x^2} \cdot e^{\frac1x} =-\left(\frac6{x^4} + \frac6{x^5} + \frac1{x^6}\right) \cdot e^{\frac{1}{x}}$

== Link to Laguerre polynomials ==
Generalized Laguerre polynomials $L^{(\alpha)}_n(x)$ are linked to Lah numbers upon setting $\alpha = -1$
$$n! L_n^{(-1)}(x) =\sum_{k=0}^n L(n,k) (-x)^k$$
This formula is the default Laguerre polynomial in Umbral calculus convention.

== Practical application ==
In recent years, Lah numbers have been used in steganography for hiding data in images. Compared to alternatives such as DCT, DFT and DWT, it has lower complexity of calculation—$O(n \log n)$—of their integer coefficients. The Lah and Laguerre transforms naturally arise in the perturbative description of the chromatic dispersion. In Lah-Laguerre optics, such an approach tremendously speeds up optimization problems.

== See also ==
- Stirling numbers
- Pascal matrix
