= Mahler's inequality =

In mathematics, Mahler's inequality, named after Kurt Mahler, states that the geometric mean of the term-by-term sum of two finite sequences of positive numbers is greater than or equal to the sum of their two separate geometric means:

$$\prod_{k=1}^n (x_k + y_k)^{1/n} \ge \prod_{k=1}^n x_k^{1/n} + \prod_{k=1}^n y_k^{1/n}$$

when $x_k,\ y_k>0$ for all $k$.

== Proof ==
By the inequality of arithmetic and geometric means, we have:

$$\prod_{k=1}^n \left({x_k \over x_k + y_k}\right)^{1/n} \le {1 \over n} \sum_{k=1}^n {x_k \over x_k + y_k},$$

and

$$\prod_{k=1}^n \left({y_k \over x_k + y_k}\right)^{1/n} \le {1 \over n} \sum_{k=1}^n {y_k \over x_k + y_k}.$$

Hence,

$$\prod_{k=1}^n \left({x_k \over x_k + y_k}\right)^{1/n}  + \prod_{k=1}^n \left({y_k \over x_k + y_k}\right)^{1/n} \le {1 \over n} n = 1.$$

Clearing denominators then gives the desired result.

== See also ==
- Minkowski inequality
