= Abel polynomials =

The Abel polynomials are a sequence of polynomials named after Niels Henrik Abel, defined by the following equation:

$$p_n(x)=x(x-an)^{n-1}$$

They occur, for instance, in the enumeration of trees (specifically, rooted labeled forests) as well as in connection with geometric probability (the random placement of nonoverlapping arcs on a circle). This polynomial sequence is of binomial type: conversely, every polynomial sequence of binomial type may be obtained from the Abel sequence using umbral calculus.

== Examples ==
For a = 1, the polynomials are (sequence A137452 in the OEIS)

$$p_0(x)=1;$$
$$p_1(x)=x;$$
$$p_2(x)=-2x+x^2;$$
$$p_3(x)=9x-6x^2+x^3;$$
$$p_4(x)=-64x +48x^2-12x^3+x^4;$$

For a = 2, the polynomials are

$$p_0(x)=1;$$
$$p_1(x)=x;$$
$$p_2(x)=-4x+x^2;$$
$$p_3(x)=36x-12x^2+x^3;$$
$$p_4(x)=-512x +192x^2-24x^3+x^4;$$
$$p_5(x)=10000x-4000x^2+600x^3-40x^4+x^5;$$
$$p_6(x)=-248832x+103680x^2-17280x^3+1440x^4-60x^5+x^6;$$
