= Jovan Karamata =

Serbian mathematician (1902–1967)

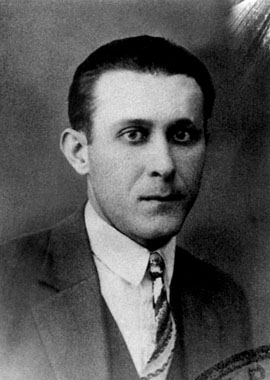
- Born: February 1, 1902; Zagreb, Kingdom of Croatia-Slavonia within Austria-Hungary (modern Croatia)
- Died: August 14, 1967 (aged 65); Geneva
- Citizenship: Austria-Hungary
- Education: University of Belgrade
- Known for: Karamata's inequality Karamata notation Slowly varying function Regularly varying function
- Awards: ICM Speaker (1928, 1932, 1936)
- Scientific career
- Fields: Mathematics
- Doctoral advisor: Mihailo Petrović
- Doctoral students: Slobodan Aljančić; Ronald Coifman

Jovan Karamata (Serbian Cyrillic: Јован Карамата; February 1, 1902 – August 14, 1967) was a Serbian mathematician and university professor. He is remembered for contributions to analysis, in particular, the Tauberian theory and the theory of regularly varying functions. Considered to be among the most influential Serbian mathematicians of the 20th century, Karamata was one of the founders of the Mathematical Institute of the Serbian Academy of Sciences and Arts, established in 1946.

== Life ==
Jovan Karamata was born in Zagreb on February 1, 1902, into a family descended from merchants based in the city of Zemun, which was then in Austria-Hungary, and now in Serbia. Being of Aromanian origin, the family traced its roots back to Pyrgoi, Eordaia, West Macedonia (his father Ioannis Karamatas was the president of the Greek Community of Zemun); Aromanians mainly lived and still live in the area of modern Greece. Its business affairs on the borders of the Austro-Hungarian and Ottoman empires were very well known.

In 1914, he finished most of his primary school in Zemun but because of constant warfare on the borderlands, Karamata's father sent him, together with his brothers and his sister, to Switzerland for their own safety. In Lausanne, 1920, he finished primary school oriented towards mathematics and sciences. In the same year he enrolled at the Engineering faculty of Belgrade University and, after several years moved to the Philosophy and Mathematicians sector, where he graduated in 1925.

He spent the years 1927–1928 in Paris, as a fellow of the Rockefeller Foundation, and in 1928 he became Assistant for Mathematics at the Faculty of Philosophy of Belgrade University. In 1930 he became Assistant Professor, in 1937 Associate Professor and, after the end of World War II, in 1950 he became Full Professor. In 1951 he was elected Full Professor at the University of Geneva. In 1933 he became a member of Yugoslav Academy of Sciences and Arts, Czech Royal Society in 1936, and Serbian Royal Academy in 1939 as well as a fellow of Serbian Academy of Sciences in 1948. He was one of the founders of the Mathematical Institute of the Serbian Academy of Sciences and Arts in 1946.

Karamata was member of the Swiss, French and German mathematical societies, the French Association for the Development of Science, and the primary editor of the journal L’Enseignement Mathématique in Geneva. He also taught at the University of Novi Sad.

In 1931 he married Emilija Nikolajevic, who gave birth to their two sons and two twin daughters. His wife died in 1959. After a long illness, Karamata died on August 14, 1967, in Geneva. His ashes rest in his native town of Zemun.

== Legacy ==
Karamata published 122 scientific papers, 15 monographs and text-books as well as 7 professional-pedagogical papers.

Karamata is best known for his work on mathematical analysis. He introduced the notion of regularly varying function, and discovered a new class of theorems of Tauberian type, today known as Karamata's tauberian theorems. He also worked on Mercer's theorems, Frullani integral, and other topics in analysis. In 1935 he introduced the brackets and braces notation for Stirling numbers (analogous to the binomial coefficients notation), which is now known as Karamata notation. He is also cited for Karamata's inequality.

In Serbia, Karamata founded the "Karamata's (Yugoslav) school of mathematics”. Today, Karamata is the most cited Serbian mathematician. He is the developer and co-developer of dozens of mathematical theorems and has had a lasting influence in 20th-century mathematics.

== See also ==
- Mihailo Petrović Alas
- Bogdan Gavrilović
