= Polynomial sequence =

Sequence valued in polynomials

In mathematics, a polynomial sequence is a sequence of polynomials indexed by the nonnegative integers 0, 1, 2, 3, ..., in which each index is equal to the degree of the corresponding polynomial. Polynomial sequences are a topic of interest in enumerative combinatorics and algebraic combinatorics, as well as applied mathematics.

== Examples ==
Some polynomial sequences arise in physics and approximation theory as the solutions of certain ordinary differential equations:

- Laguerre polynomials
- Chebyshev polynomials
- Legendre polynomials
- Zernike polynomials
- Jacobi polynomials

Others come from statistics:

- Hermite polynomials

Many are studied in algebra and combinatorics:

- Monomials
- Rising factorials
- Falling factorials
- All-one polynomials
- Abel polynomials
- Bell polynomials
- Bernoulli polynomials
- Cyclotomic polynomials
- Dickson polynomials
- Fibonacci polynomials
- Lagrange polynomials
- Lucas polynomials
- Spread polynomials
- Touchard polynomials
- Rook polynomials

== Classes of polynomial sequences ==
- Polynomial sequences of binomial type
- Orthogonal polynomials
- Secondary polynomials
- Sheffer sequence
- Sturm sequence
- Generalized Appell polynomials

== See also ==
- Umbral calculus
