= Touchard polynomials =

Sequence of polynomials

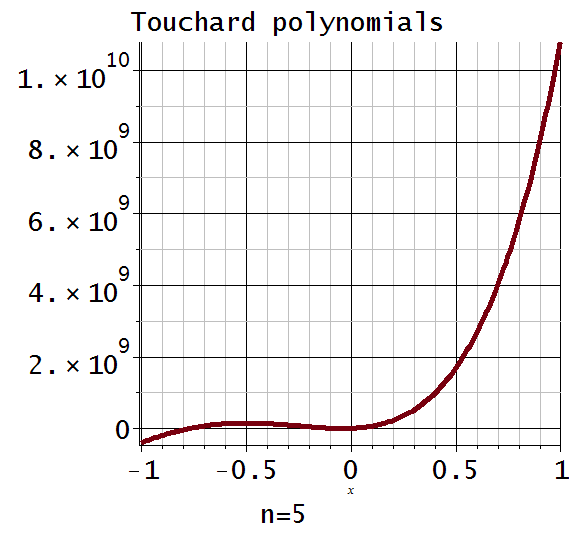
Touchard Polynomials

The Touchard polynomials, studied by Jacques Touchard (1956), also called the exponential polynomials or Bell polynomials, comprise a polynomial sequence of binomial type defined by

$$T_n(x)=\sum_{k=0}^n S(n,k)x^k=\sum_{k=0}^n
\left\{ {n \atop k} \right\}x^k,$$

where $S(n,k)=\left\{ {n \atop k} \right\}$ is a Stirling number of the second kind, i.e., the number of partitions of a set of size n into k disjoint non-empty subsets.

The first few Touchard polynomials are

$$T_1(x)=x,$$
$$T_2(x)=x^2+x,$$
$$T_3(x)=x^3+3x^2+x,$$
$$T_4(x)=x^4+6x^3+7x^2+x,$$
$$T_5(x)=x^5+10x^4+25x^3+15x^2+x.$$

== Properties ==
=== Basic properties ===
The value at 1 of the nth Touchard polynomial is the nth Bell number, i.e., the number of partitions of a set of size n:

$$T_n(1)=B_n.$$

If X is a random variable with a Poisson distribution with expected value λ, then its nth moment is E(X^{n}) = T_{n}(λ), leading to the definition:

$$T_{n}(x)=e^{-x}\sum_{k=0}^\infty \frac {x^k k^n} {k!}.$$

Using this fact one can quickly prove that this polynomial sequence is of binomial type, i.e., it satisfies the sequence of identities:

$$T_n(\lambda+\mu)=\sum_{k=0}^n {n \choose k} T_k(\lambda) T_{n-k}(\mu).$$

The Touchard polynomials constitute the only polynomial sequence of binomial type with the coefficient of x equal 1 in every polynomial.

The Touchard polynomials satisfy the Rodrigues-like formula:

$$T_n \left(e^x \right) = e^{-e^x} \frac{d^n}{dx^n}\;e^{e^x}.$$

The Touchard polynomials satisfy the recurrence relation

$$T_{n+1}(x)=x \left(T_{n}(x) + T'_{n}(x)\right)$$

and

$$T_{n+1}(x)=x\sum_{k=0}^n{n \choose k}T_k(x).$$

In the case x = 1, this reduces to the recurrence formula for the Bell numbers.

A generalization of both this formula and the definition, is a generalization of Spivey's formula

$$T_{n+m}(x) = \sum_{k=0}^n \left\{ {n \atop k} \right\} x^k \sum_{j=0}^m \binom{m}{j} k^{m-j} T_j(x)$$

Using the umbral notation T^{n}(x)=T_{n}(x), these formulas become:

$T_n(\lambda+\mu)=\left(T(\lambda)+T(\mu) \right)^n,$
$$T_{n+1}(x)=x \left(1+T(x) \right)^n.$$

The generating function of the Touchard polynomials is

$$\sum_{n=0}^\infty {T_n(x) \over n!} t^n=e^{x\left(e^t-1\right)},$$

which corresponds to the generating function of Stirling numbers of the second kind.

Touchard polynomials have contour integral representation:

$$T_n(x)=\frac{n!}{2\pi i}\oint\frac{e^{x({e^t}-1)}}{t^{n+1}}\,dt.$$

=== Zeroes ===
All zeroes of the Touchard polynomials are real and negative. This fact was observed by L. H. Harper in 1967.

The absolute value of the leftmost zero is bounded from above by

$$\frac1n\binom{n}{2}+\frac{n-1}{n}\sqrt{\binom{n}{2}^2-\frac{2n}{n-1}\left(\binom{n}{3}+3\binom{n}{4}\right)},$$

although it is conjectured that the leftmost zero grows linearly with the index n.

The Mahler measure $M(T_n)$ of the Touchard polynomials can be estimated as follows:

$$\frac{\lbrace\textstyle{n\atop \Omega_n}\rbrace}{\binom{n}{\Omega_n}}\le M(T_n)\le\sqrt{n+1}\left\{{n\atop K_n}\right\},$$

where $\Omega_n$ and $K_n$ are the smallest of the maximum two k indices such that $\lbrace\textstyle{n\atop k}\rbrace/\binom{n}{k}$ and $\lbrace\textstyle{n\atop k}\rbrace$ are maximal, respectively.

== Generalizations ==
- Complete Bell polynomial $B_n(x_1,x_2,\dots,x_n)$ may be viewed as a multivariate generalization of Touchard polynomial $T_n(x)$, since $T_n(x) = B_n(x,x,\dots,x).$
- The Touchard polynomials (and thereby the Bell numbers) can be generalized, using the real part of the above integral, to non-integer order:
  $$T_n(x)=\frac{n!}{\pi} \int^{\pi}_0 e^{x \bigl(e^{\cos(\theta)} \cos(\sin(\theta))-1 \bigr)} \cos \bigl(x e^{\cos(\theta)} \sin(\sin(\theta)) -n\theta\bigr) \, d\theta\, .$$

== See also ==
- Bell polynomials
- Mahler polynomial
