= Jacques Touchard =

French mathematician

Jacques André Charles Touchard
- Born: August 19, 1885; Sissach, Switzerland
- Died: September 5, 1968 (aged 83); Lausanne, Switzerland
- Education: École Centrale des Arts et Manufactures École supérieure d'électricité
- Occupations: Mathematician, engineer
- Known for: Touchard polynomials Ménage problem
- Spouse: Marie Gentil (m. 1920)
- Children: 3
- Father: Charles Philippe Touchard
- Honours: Croix de Guerre Chevalier de la Légion d'honneur Médaille de la Résistance

Jacques André Charles Touchard (1885–1968) was a French mathematician. In 1953, he proved that an odd perfect number must be of the form $12k + 1$ or $36k + 9$. In combinatorics and probability theory, he introduced the Touchard polynomials. He is also known for his solution to the ménage problem of counting seating arrangements in which men and women alternate and are not seated next to their spouses.

== Touchard's Catalan identity ==
The following algebraic identity involving the Catalan numbers

$$C_k ={ 1\over{k+1}}{{2k}\choose {k}},\quad k \ge 0$$

is apparently due to Touchard (according to Richard P. Stanley, who mentions it in his panorama article "Exercises on Catalan and Related Numbers" giving an overwhelming plenitude of different definitions for the Catalan numbers). For $n \geq 0$ one has

$$C_{n+1} = \sum_{k \,\le\, n/2} 2^{n-2k} {n \choose 2k} C_k. \,$$

Using the generating function

$$C(t)=\sum_{n \ge 0} C_n t^n ={{1-\sqrt{1-4t}}\over {2t}}$$

it can be proved by algebraic manipulations of generating series that Touchard's identity is equivalent to the functional equation

$${t \over {1-2t}} C\left({t^2\over (1-2t)^2}\right) = C(t)-1$$

satisfied by the Catalan generating series $C(t)$.
