= Mahler polynomial =

In mathematics, the Mahler polynomials g_{n}(x) are polynomials introduced by Mahler in his work on the zeros of the incomplete gamma function.

Mahler polynomials are given by the generating function

$$\displaystyle \sum g_n(x)t^n/n! = \exp(x(1+t-e^t))$$

Which is close to the generating function of the Touchard polynomials.

The first few examples are (sequence A008299 in the OEIS)

$$g_0=1;$$
$$g_1=0;$$
$$g_2=-x;$$
$$g_3=-x;$$
$$g_4=-x+3x^2;$$
$$g_5=-x+10x^2;$$
$$g_6=-x+25x^2-15x^3;$$
$$g_7=-x+56x^2-105x^3;$$
$$g_8=-x+119x^2-490x^3+105x^4;$$
