= Inverse relation =

In mathematics, inverse relation may refer to:

- Converse relation or "transpose", in set theory
- Negative relationship, in statistics
- Inverse proportionality
- Relation between two sequences, expressing each of them in terms of the other
