= Series multisection =

In mathematics, series built from equally spaced terms of another series

In mathematics, a multisection of a power series is a new power series composed of equally spaced terms extracted unaltered from the original series. Formally, if one is given a power series

$$\sum_{n=-\infty}^\infty a_n\cdot z^n$$

then its multisection is a power series of the form

$$\sum_{m=-\infty}^\infty a_{qm+p}\cdot z^{qm+p}$$

where p, q are integers, with 0 ≤ p < q. Series multisection represents one of the common transformations of generating functions.

== Multisection of analytic functions ==
A multisection of the series of an analytic function

$$f(z) = \sum_{n=0}^\infty a_n\cdot z^n$$

has a closed-form expression in terms of the function $f(x)$:

$$\sum_{m=0}^\infty a_{qm+p}\cdot z^{qm+p} = \frac{1}{q}\cdot \sum_{k=0}^{q-1} \omega^{-kp}\cdot f(\omega^k\cdot z),$$

where $\omega = e^{\frac{2\pi i}{q}}$ is a primitive q-th root of unity. This expression is often called a root of unity filter. This solution was first discovered by Thomas Simpson.

This is the projection of the representation of $\mathbb{Z}/q\mathbb{Z}$ via $(g^n \cdot f)(x) = f(\omega^-q x)$ onto the isotype of the irreducible representation whose character is $\chi(g) = \omega^{p}$ (and in this case since it's abelian, the action is just multiplying by the character) .

== Examples ==
=== Bisection ===
In general, the bisections of a series are the even and odd parts of the series.

=== Geometric series ===
Consider the geometric series

$$\sum_{n=0}^{\infty} z^n=\frac{1}{1-z} \quad\text{ for }|z| < 1.$$

By setting $z \rightarrow z^q$ in the above series, its multisections are easily seen to be

$$\sum_{m=0}^{\infty} z^{qm+p} = \frac{z^p}{1-z^q} \quad\text{ for }|z| < 1.$$

Remembering that the sum of the multisections must equal the original series, we recover the familiar identity

$$\sum_{p=0}^{q-1} z^p = \frac{1-z^q}{1-z}.$$

=== Exponential function ===
The exponential function

$$e^z=\sum_{n=0}^{\infty} {z^n \over n!}$$

by means of the above formula for analytic functions separates into

$$\sum_{m=0}^\infty {z^{qm+p} \over (qm+p)!} = \frac{1}{q}\cdot \sum_{k=0}^{q-1} \omega^{-kp} e^{\omega^k z}.$$

The bisections are trivially the hyperbolic functions:

$$\sum_{m=0}^\infty {z^{2m} \over (2m)!} = \frac{1}{2}\left(e^z+e^{-z}\right) = \cosh{z}$$
$$\sum_{m=0}^\infty {z^{2m+1} \over (2m+1)!} = \frac{1}{2}\left(e^z-e^{-z}\right) = \sinh{z}.$$

Higher order multisections are found by noting that all such series must be real-valued along the real line. By taking the real part and using standard trigonometric identities, the formulas may be written in explicitly real form as

$$\sum_{m=0}^\infty {z^{qm+p} \over (qm+p)!} = \frac{1}{q}\cdot \sum_{k=0}^{q-1} e^{z\cos(2\pi k/q)}\cos{\left(z\sin{\left(\frac{2\pi k}{q}\right)}-\frac{2\pi kp}{q}\right)}.$$

These can be seen as solutions to the linear differential equation $f^{(q)}(z)=f(z)$ with boundary conditions $f^{(k)}(0)=\delta_{k,p}$, using Kronecker delta notation. In particular, the trisections are

$$\sum_{m=0}^\infty {z^{3m} \over (3m)!} = \frac{1}{3}\left(e^z+2e^{-z/2}\cos{\frac{\sqrt{3}z}{2}}\right)$$
$$\sum_{m=0}^\infty {z^{3m+1} \over (3m+1)!} = \frac{1}{3}\left(e^z-2e^{-z/2}\cos{\left(\frac{\sqrt{3}z}{2}+\frac{\pi}{3}\right)}\right)$$
$$\sum_{m=0}^\infty {z^{3m+2} \over (3m+2)!} = \frac{1}{3}\left(e^z-2e^{-z/2}\cos{\left(\frac{\sqrt{3}z}{2}-\frac{\pi}{3}\right)}\right),$$

and the quadrisections are

$$\sum_{m=0}^\infty {z^{4m} \over (4m)!} = \frac{1}{2}\left(\cosh{z}+\cos{z}\right)$$
$$\sum_{m=0}^\infty {z^{4m+1} \over (4m+1)!} = \frac{1}{2}\left(\sinh{z}+\sin{z}\right)$$
$$\sum_{m=0}^\infty {z^{4m+2} \over (4m+2)!} = \frac{1}{2}\left(\cosh{z}-\cos{z}\right)$$
$$\sum_{m=0}^\infty {z^{4m+3} \over (4m+3)!} = \frac{1}{2}\left(\sinh{z}-\sin{z}\right).$$

=== Binomial series ===
Multisection of a binomial expansion

$$(1+x)^n = {n\choose 0} x^0 + {n\choose 1} x + {n\choose 2} x^2 + \cdots$$

at x = 1 gives the following identity for the sum of binomial coefficients with step q:

$${n\choose p} + {n\choose p+q} + {n\choose p+2q} + \cdots = \frac{1}{q}\cdot \sum_{k=0}^{q-1} \left(2 \cos\frac{\pi k}{q}\right )^n\cdot \cos \frac{\pi(n-2p)k}{q}.$$

== Applications ==
Series multisection converts an infinite sum into a finite sum. It is used, for example, in a key step of a standard proof of Gauss's digamma theorem, which gives a closed-form solution to the digamma function evaluated at rational values p/q.
