= Generating function transformation =

Operation on formal power series

In mathematics a transformation of a sequence's generating function provides a method of converting the generating function for one sequence into a generating function enumerating another. These transformations typically involve integral formulas applied to a sequence generating function (see integral transformations) or weighted sums over the higher-order derivatives of these functions (see derivative transformations).

Given a sequence, $\{f_n\}_{n=0}^{\infty}$, the ordinary generating function (OGF) of the sequence, denoted $F(z)$, and the exponential generating function (EGF) of the sequence, denoted $\widehat{F}(z)$, are defined by the formal power series:

$$F(z) = \sum_{n=0}^\infty f_n z^n = f_0 + f_1 z + f_2 z^2 + \cdots$$
$$\widehat{F}(z) = \sum_{n=0}^\infty \frac{f_n}{n!} z^n = \frac{f_0}{0!} + \frac{f_1}{1!} z + \frac{f_2}{2!} z^2 + \cdots.$$

In this article, we use the convention that the ordinary (exponential) generating function for a sequence $\{f_n\}$ is denoted by the uppercase function $F(z)$ / $\widehat{F}(z)$ for some fixed or formal $z$ when the context of this notation is clear. Additionally, we use the bracket notation for coefficient extraction from the Concrete Mathematics reference which is given by $[z^n]F(z) := f_n$. The main article gives examples of generating functions for many sequences. Other examples of generating function variants include Dirichlet generating functions (DGFs), Lambert series, and Newton series. In this article we focus on transformations of generating functions in mathematics and keep a running list of useful transformations and transformation formulas.

== Extracting arithmetic progressions of a sequence ==
Series multisection provides formulas for generating functions enumerating the sequence $\{f_{an+b}\}$ given an ordinary generating function $F(z)$ where $a, b \in \mathbb{N}$, $a \geq 2$, and $0 \leq b < a$. In the first two cases where $(a, b) := (2, 0), (2, 1)$, we can expand these arithmetic progression generating functions directly in terms of $F(z)$:

$$\sum_{n \geq 0} f_{2n} z^{2n} = \frac{1}{2}\left(F(z) + F(-z)\right)$$
$$\sum_{n \geq 0} f_{2n+1} z^{2n+1} = \frac{1}{2}\left(F(z) - F(-z)\right).$$

More generally, suppose that $a \geq 3$ and that $\omega_a := \exp\left(\frac{2\pi\imath}{a}\right)$ denotes the $a^{th}$ primitive root of unity. Then we have the following formula, often known as the root of unity filter:

$$\sum_{n \geq 0} f_{an+b} z^{an+b} = \frac{1}{a} \times \sum_{m=0}^{a-1} \omega_a^{-mb} F\left(\omega_a^{m}z\right).$$

For integers $m \geq 1$, another useful formula providing somewhat reversed floored arithmetic progressions are generated by the identity

$$\sum_{n \geq 0} f_{\lfloor \frac{n}{m} \rfloor} z^n = \frac{1-z^m}{1-z} F(z^m) = \left(1+z+\cdots+z^{m-2} + z^{m-1}\right) F(z^m).$$

== Powers of an OGF and composition with functions ==
The exponential Bell polynomials, $B_{n,k}(x_1, \ldots, x_n) := n! \cdot [t^n u^k] \Phi(t, u)$, are defined by the exponential generating function

$$\Phi(t, u) = \exp\left(u \times \sum_{m \geq 1} x_m \frac{t^m}{m!}\right) =
1 + \sum_{n \geq 1} \left\{\sum_{k=1}^{n} B_{n,k}(x_1, x_2, \ldots) u^k\right\} \frac{t^n}{n!}.$$

The next formulas for powers, logarithms, and compositions of formal power series are expanded by these polynomials with variables in the coefficients of the original generating functions. The formula for the exponential of a generating function is given implicitly through the Bell polynomials by the EGF for these polynomials defined in the previous formula for some sequence of $\{x_i\}$.

=== Reciprocals of an OGF (special case of the powers formula) ===
The power series for the reciprocal of a generating function, $F(z)$, is expanded by

$$\frac{1}{F(z)} = \frac{1}{f_0} - \frac{f_1}{f_0^2} z + \frac{\left(f_1^2-f_0 f_2\right)}{f_0^3} z^2 -
\frac{f_1^3-2f_0f_1f_2+f_0^2f_3}{f_0^4} z^3 + \cdots.$$

If we let $b_n := [z^n] 1 / F(z)$ denote the coefficients in the expansion of the reciprocal generating function, then we have the following recurrence relation:

$$b_n = - \frac{1}{f_0}\left(f_1 b_{n-1} + f_2 b_{n-2} + \cdots + f_n b_0\right), n \geq 1.$$

=== Powers of an OGF ===
Let $m \in \mathbb{C}$ be fixed, suppose that $f_0 = 1$, and denote $b_n^{(m)} := [z^n] F(z)^m$. Then we have a series expansion for $F(z)^m$ given by

$$F(z)^m = 1 + m f_1 z + m\left((m-1)f_1^2+2f_2\right) \frac{z^2}{2} +
\left(m(m-1)(m-2)f_1^3 +6m(m-1) f_1f_2+6mf_3\right) \frac{z^3}{6} + \cdots,$$

and the coefficients $b_n^{(m)}$ satisfy a recurrence relation of the form

$$n \cdot b_n^{(m)} = (m-n+1) f_1 b_{n-1}^{(m)} + (2m-n+2) f_2 b_{n-2}^{(m)} + \cdots + ((n-1)m-1) f_{n-1} b_1^{(m)} + n m f_n, n \geq 1.$$

Another formula for the coefficients, $b_n^{(m)}$, is expanded by the Bell polynomials as

$$F(z)^m = f_0^m + \sum_{n \geq 1} \left(\sum_{1 \leq k \leq n} (m)_k f_0^{m-k} B_{n,k}\big(f_1 \cdot 1!, f_2 \cdot 2!, \ldots, f_{n-k+1} \cdot (n-k+1)!\big) \right) \frac{z^n}{n!},$$

where $(r)_n$ denotes the Pochhammer symbol.

=== Logarithms of an OGF ===
If we let $f_0 = 1$ and define $q_n := [z^n] \log F(z)$, then we have a power series expansion for the composite generating function given by

$$\log F(z) = f_1 z + \frac{2f_2 - f_1^2}{2} z^2
+ \frac{3f_3 - 3f_1f_2 + f_1^3}{3} z^3 + \dots$$

where the coefficients, $q_n$, in the previous expansion satisfy the recurrence relation given by

$$n \cdot q_n = n f_n - (n-1)f_1 q_{n-1} - (n-2)f_2 q_{n-2} - \cdots - f_{n-1} q_1,$$

and a corresponding formula expanded by the Bell polynomials in the form of the power series coefficients of the following generating function:

$$\log F(z) = \sum_{n \geq 1} \left(\sum_{1 \leq k \leq n} (-1)^{k-1} (k-1)! B_{n,k}(f_1 \cdot 1!, f_2 \cdot 2!, \ldots)\right) \frac{z^n}{n!}.$$

=== Faà di Bruno's formula ===
Let $\widehat{F}(z)$ denote the EGF of the sequence, $\{f_n\}_{n \geq 0}$, and suppose that $\widehat{G}(z)$ is the EGF of the sequence, $\{g_n\}_{n \geq 0}$. Faà di Bruno's formula implies that the sequence, $\{h_n\}_{n \geq 0}$, generated by the composition $\widehat{H}(z) := \widehat{F}(\widehat{G}(z))$, can be expressed in terms of the exponential Bell polynomials as follows:

$$h_n = \sum_{1 \leq k \leq n} f_k \cdot B_{n,k}(g_1, g_2, \cdots, g_{n-k+1}) + f_0 \cdot \delta_{n,0}.$$

== Integral transformations ==
=== OGF ⟷ EGF conversion formulas ===
We have the following integral formulas for $a, b \in \mathbb{Z}^{+}$ which can be applied termwise with respect to $z$ when $z$ is taken to be any formal power series variable:

$$\sum_{n \geq 0} f_n z^n = \int_0^{\infty} \widehat{F}(tz) e^{-t} dt = z^{-1} \mathcal{L}[\widehat{F}](z^{-1})$$
$$\sum_{n \geq 0} \Gamma(an+b) \cdot f_n z^n = \int_0^{\infty} t^{b-1} e^{-t} F(t^a z) dt.$$
$$\sum_{n \geq 0} \frac{f_n}{n!} z^n = \frac{1}{2\pi} \int_{-\pi}^{\pi} F\left(z e^{-\imath\vartheta}\right) e^{e^{\imath\vartheta}} d\vartheta.$$

Notice that the first and last of these integral formulas are used to convert between the EGF to the OGF of a sequence, and from the OGF to the EGF of a sequence whenever these integrals are convergent.

The first integral formula corresponds to the Laplace transform (or sometimes the formal Laplace–Borel transformation) of generating functions, denoted by $\mathcal{L}[F](z)$, defined in. Other integral representations for the gamma function in the second of the previous formulas can of course also be used to construct similar integral transformations. One particular formula results in the case of the double factorial function example given immediately below in this section. The last integral formula is compared to Hankel's loop integral for the reciprocal gamma function applied termwise to the power series for $F(z)$.

==== Example: A double factorial integral for the EGF of the Stirling numbers of the second kind ====
The single factorial function, $(2n)!$, is expressed as a product of two double factorial functions of the form

$$(2n)! = (2n)!! \times (2n-1)!! = \frac{4^n \cdot n!}{\sqrt{\pi}} \times \Gamma\left(n+\frac{1}{2}\right),$$

where an integral for the double factorial function, or rational gamma function, is given by

$$\frac{1}{2} \cdot (2n-1)!! = \frac{2^n}{\sqrt{4\pi}} \Gamma\left(n+\frac{1}{2}\right) =
\frac{1}{\sqrt{2\pi}} \times \int_0^{\infty} e^{-t^2 / 2} t^{2n} \, dt,$$

for natural numbers $n \geq 0$. This integral representation of $(2n-1)!!$ then implies that for fixed non-zero $q \in \mathbb{C}$ and any integral powers $k \geq 0$, we have the formula

$$\frac{\log(q)^k}{k!} = \frac{1}{(2k)!} \times \left[\int_0^{\infty} \frac{2 e^{-t^2/2}}{\sqrt{2\pi}}
\left(\sqrt{2\log(q)} \cdot t\right)^{2k} \, dt\right].$$

Thus for any prescribed integer $j \geq 0$, we can use the previous integral representation together with the formula for extracting arithmetic progressions from a sequence OGF given above, to formulate the next integral representation for the so-termed modified Stirling number EGF as

$$\sum_{n \geq 0} \left\{\begin{matrix} 2n \\ j \end{matrix} \right\} \frac{\log(q)^n}{n!} =
\int_0^{\infty} \frac{e^{-t^2/2}}{\sqrt{2\pi} \cdot j!}\left[\sum_{b = \pm 1}
\left(e^{b\sqrt{2 \log(q)} \cdot t}-1\right)^j\right] dt,$$

which is convergent provided suitable conditions on the parameter $0 < |q| < 1$.

==== Example: An EGF formula for the higher-order derivatives of the geometric series ====
For fixed non-zero $c, z \in \mathbb{C}$ defined such that $|cz| < 1$, let the geometric series over the non-negative integral powers of $(cz)^n$ be denoted by $G(z) := 1 / (1-cz)$. The corresponding higher-order $j^{th}$ derivatives of the geometric series with respect to $z$ are denoted by the sequence of functions

$$G_j(z) := \frac{(cz)^j}{1-cz} \times \left(\frac{d}{dz}\right)^{(j)}\left[G(z)\right],$$

for non-negative integers $j \geq 0$. These $j^{th}$ derivatives of the ordinary geometric series can be shown, for example by induction, to satisfy an explicit closed-form formula given by

$$G_j(z) = \frac{c^{2j} z^j j!}{(1 - cz)^{j + 2}}$$

for any $j \geq 0$ whenever $|cz| < 1$. As an example of the third OGF $\longmapsto$ EGF conversion formula cited above, we can compute the following corresponding exponential forms of the generating functions $G_j(z)$:

$$\widehat{G}_j(z) = \frac{1}{2\pi} \int_{-\pi}^{\pi} G_j\left(ze^{-it}\right) e^{it} \, dt
= \frac{c^{2j} z^j e^{cz}}{j+1} \left( j + 1 + cz \right)$$

=== Fractional integrals and derivatives ===
Fractional integrals and fractional derivatives (see the main article) form another generalized class of integration and differentiation operations that can be applied to the OGF of a sequence to form the corresponding OGF of a transformed sequence. For $\Re(\alpha) > 0$ we define the fractional integral operator (of order $\alpha$) by the integral transformation

$$I^{\alpha} F(z) = \frac{1}{\Gamma(\alpha)} \int_0^{z} (z-t)^{\alpha-1} F(t) dt,$$

which corresponds to the (formal) power series given by

$$I^{\alpha} F(z) = \sum_{n \geq 0} \frac{n!}{\Gamma(n+\alpha+1)} f_n z^{n+\alpha}.$$

For fixed $\alpha, \beta \in \mathbb{C}$ defined such that $\Re(\alpha), \Re(\beta) > 0$, we have that the operators $I^{\alpha} I^{\beta} = I^{\alpha+\beta}$. Moreover, for fixed $\alpha \in \mathbb{C}$ and integers $n$ satisfying $0 < \Re(\alpha) < n$ we can define the notion of the fractional derivative satisfying the properties that

$$D^{\alpha} F(z) = \frac{d^{(n)}}{dz^{(n)}} I^{n-\alpha}F(z),$$

and

$D^{k} I^{\alpha} = D^{n} I^{\alpha+n-k}$ for $k = 1, 2, \ldots, n,$

where we have the semigroup property that $D^{\alpha} D^{\beta} = D^{\alpha+\beta}$ only when none of $\alpha, \beta, \alpha+\beta$ is integer-valued.

=== Polylogarithm series transformations ===
For fixed $s \in \mathbb{Z}^{+}$, we have that (compare to the special case of the integral formula for the Nielsen generalized polylogarithm function defined in)

$$\sum_{n \geq 0} \frac{f_n}{(n+1)^s} z^n = \frac{(-1)^{s-1}}{(s-1)!} \int_0^1 \log^{s-1}(t) F(tz) dt.$$

Notice that if we set $g_n \equiv f_{n+1}$, the integral with respect to the generating function, $G(z)$, in the last equation when $z \equiv 1$ corresponds to the Dirichlet generating function, or DGF, $\widetilde{F}(s)$, of the sequence of $\{f_n\}$ provided that the integral converges. This class of polylogarithm-related integral transformations is related to the derivative-based zeta series transformations defined in the next sections.

=== Square series generating function transformations ===
For fixed non-zero $q, c, z \in \mathbb{C}$ such that $|q| < 1$ and $|cz| < 1$, we have the following integral representations for the so-termed square series generating function associated with the sequence $\{f_n\}$, which can be integrated termwise with respect to $z$:

$$\sum_{n \geq 0} q^{n^2} f_n \cdot (cz)^n = \frac{1}{\sqrt{2\pi}} \int_0^{\infty} e^{-t^2/2}\left[F\left(e^{t\sqrt{2\log(q)}} \cdot cz\right) + F\left(e^{-t \sqrt{2\log(q)}} \cdot cz\right)\right] dt.$$

This result, which is proved in the reference, follows from a variant of the double factorial function transformation integral for the Stirling numbers of the second kind given as an example above. In particular, since

$$q^{n^2} = \exp(n^2 \cdot \log(q)) = 1 + n^2 \log(q) + n^4 \frac{\log(q)^2}{2!} + n^6 \frac{\log(q)^3}{3!} + \cdots,$$

we can use a variant of the positive-order derivative-based OGF transformations defined in the next sections involving the Stirling numbers of the second kind to obtain an integral formula for the generating function of the sequence, $\left\{S(2n, j) / n!\right\}$, and then perform a sum over the $j^{th}$ derivatives of the formal OGF, $F(z)$ to obtain the result in the previous equation where the arithmetic progression generating function at hand is denoted by

$$\sum_{n \geq 0} \left\{\begin{matrix} 2n \\ j \end{matrix} \right\} \frac{z^{2n}}{(2n)!} = \frac{1}{2 j!}\left((e^z-1)^j + (e^{-z}-1)^j\right),$$

for each fixed $j \in \mathbb{N}$.

== Hadamard products and diagonal generating functions ==
We have an integral representation for the Hadamard product of two generating functions, $F(z)$ and $G(z)$, stated in the following form:

$$(F \odot G)(z) := \sum_{n \geq 0} f_n g_n z^n =
\frac{1}{2\pi} \int_0^{2\pi} F\left(\sqrt{z} e^{i t}\right) G\left(\sqrt{z} e^{-i t}\right) dt,$$

where i is the imaginary unit.

More information about Hadamard products as diagonal generating functions of multivariate sequences and/or generating functions and the classes of generating functions these diagonal OGFs belong to is found in Stanley's book. The reference also provides nested coefficient extraction formulas of the form

$$\operatorname{diag}\left(F_1 \cdots F_k\right) := \sum_{n \geq 0} f_{1,n} \cdots f_{k,n} z^n =
[x_{k-1}^0 \cdots x_2^0 x_1^0] F_k\left(\frac{z}{x_{k-1}}\right)
F_{k-1}\left(\frac{x_{k-1}}{x_{k-2}}\right) \cdots F_2\left(\frac{x_2}{x_1}\right) F_1(x_1),$$

which are particularly useful in the cases where the component sequence generating functions, $F_i(z)$, can be expanded in a Laurent series, or fractional series, in $z$, such as in the special case where all of the component generating functions are rational, which leads to an algebraic form of the corresponding diagonal generating function.

=== Example: Hadamard products of rational generating functions ===
In general, the Hadamard product of two rational generating functions is itself rational. This is seen by noticing that the coefficients of a rational generating function form quasi-polynomial terms of the form

$$f_n = p_1(n) \rho_1^n + \cdots + p_{\ell}(n) \rho_{\ell}^n,$$

where the reciprocal roots, $\rho_i \in \mathbb{C}$, are fixed scalars and where $p_i(n)$ is a polynomial in $n$ for all $1 \leq i \leq \ell$. For example, the Hadamard product of the two generating functions

$$F(z) := \frac{1}{1+a_1 z+a_2 z^2}$$

and

$$G(z) := \frac{1}{1+b_1 z+b_2 z^2}$$

is given by the rational generating function formula

$$(F \odot G)(z) = \frac{1-a_2b_2 z^2}{1-a_1b_1 z + \left(a_2b_1^2+a_1^2b_2-a_2b_2\right) z^2 -a_1a_2b_1b_2 z^3 + a_2^2b_2^2 z^4}.$$

=== Example: Factorial (approximate Laplace) transformations ===
Ordinary generating functions for generalized factorial functions formed as special cases of the generalized rising factorial product functions, or Pochhammer k-symbol, defined by

$$p_n(\alpha, R) := R(R+\alpha) \cdots (R+(n-1)\alpha) = \alpha^n \cdot \left(\frac{R}{\alpha}\right)_n,$$

where $R$ is fixed, $\alpha \neq 0$, and $(x)_n$ denotes the Pochhammer symbol are generated (at least formally) by the Jacobi-type J-fractions (or special forms of continued fractions) established in the reference. If we let $\operatorname{Conv}_h(\alpha, R; z) := \operatorname{FP}_h(\alpha, R; z) / \operatorname{FQ}_h(\alpha, R; z)$ denote the $h^\text{th}$ convergent to these infinite continued fractions where the component convergent functions are defined for all integers $h \geq 2$ by

$$\operatorname{FP}_h(\alpha, R; z) = \sum_{n=0}^{h-1}\left[\sum_{k=0}^{n} \binom{h}{k} \left(1-h-\frac{R}{\alpha}\right)_k \left(\frac{R}{\alpha}\right)_{n-k}\right] (\alpha z)^n,$$

and

$$\begin{align}
\operatorname{FQ}_h(\alpha, R; z) & = (-\alpha z)^h \cdot h! \times L_h^{\left(R / \alpha-1\right)}\left((\alpha z)^{-1}\right) \\
& = \sum_{k=0}^{h} \binom{h}{k} \left[\prod_{j=0}^{k-1} (R+(j-1-j)\alpha)\right] (-z)^k,
\end{align}$$

where $L_n^{(\beta)}(x)$ denotes an associated Laguerre polynomial, then we have that the $h^{th}$ convergent function, $\operatorname{Conv}_h(\alpha, R; z)$, exactly enumerates the product sequences, $p_n(\alpha, R)$, for all $0 \leq n < 2h$. For each $h \geq 2$, the $h^{th}$ convergent function is expanded as a finite sum involving only paired reciprocals of the Laguerre polynomials in the form of

$$\operatorname{Conv}_h(\alpha, R; z) = \sum_{i=0}^{h-1} \binom{\frac{R}{\alpha}+i-1}{i} \times
\frac{(-\alpha z)^{-1}}{(i+1) \cdot L_i^{\left(R/\alpha-1\right)}\left((\alpha z)^{-1}\right)
L_{i+1}^{\left(R/\alpha-1\right)}\left((\alpha z)^{-1}\right)}$$

Moreover, since the single factorial function is given by both $n! = p_n(1, 1)$ and $n! = p_n(-1, n)$, we can generate the single factorial function terms using the approximate rational convergent generating functions up to order $2h$. This observation suggests an approach to approximating the exact (formal) Laplace–Borel transform usually given in terms of the integral representation from the previous section by a Hadamard product, or diagonal-coefficient, generating function. In particular, given any OGF $G(z)$ we can form the approximate Laplace transform, which is $2h$-order accurate, by the diagonal coefficient extraction formula stated above given by

$$\begin{align}
\widetilde{\mathcal{L}}_h[G](z) & := [x^0] \operatorname{Conv}_h\left(1, 1; \frac{z}{x}\right) G(x) \\
&\ = \frac{1}{2\pi} \int_0^{2\pi}
\operatorname{Conv}_h\left(1, 1; \sqrt{z} e^{I t}\right) G\left(\sqrt{z} e^{-I t}\right) dt.
\end{align}$$

Examples of sequences enumerated through these diagonal coefficient generating functions arising from the sequence factorial function multiplier provided by the rational convergent functions include

$$\begin{align}
n!^2 & = [z^n][x^0] \operatorname{Conv}_h\left(-1, n; \frac{z}{x}\right) \operatorname{Conv}_h\left(-1, n; x\right), h \geq n \\
\binom{2n}{n} & = [x_1^0 x_2^0 z^n] \operatorname{Conv}_h\left(-2, 2n; \frac{z}{x_2}\right)
\operatorname{Conv}_h\left(-2, 2n-1; \frac{x_2}{x_1}\right)
I_0(2\sqrt{x_1}) \\
\binom{3n}{n} \binom{2n}{n} & = [x_1^0 x_2^0 z^n] \operatorname{Conv}_h\left(-3, 3n-1; \frac{3z}{x_2}\right)
\operatorname{Conv}_h\left(-3, 3n-2; \frac{x_2}{x_1}\right)
I_0(2\sqrt{x_1}) \\
!n & = n! \times \sum_{i=0}^{n} \frac{(-1)^i}{i!} =
[z^n x^0] \left(\frac{e^{-x}}{(1-x)} \operatorname{Conv}_n\left(-1, n; \frac{z}{x}\right)\right) \\
\operatorname{af}(n) & = \sum_{k=1}^{n} (-1)^{n-k} k! = [z^n]\left(\frac{\operatorname{Conv}_n(1, 1; z)-1}{1+z}\right) \\
(t-1)^n P_n\left(\frac{t+1}{t-1}\right) & = \sum_{k=0}^{n} \binom{n}{k}^2 t^k \\
& =
[x_1^0 x_2^0] [z^n] \left(\operatorname{Conv}_n\left(1, 1; \frac{z}{x_1}\right)
\operatorname{Conv}_n\left(1, 1; \frac{x_1}{x_2}\right)
I_0(2\sqrt{t \cdot x_2}) I_0(2\sqrt{x_2})\right), n \geq 1 \\
(2n-1)!! & = \sum_{k=1}^{n} \frac{(n-1)!}{(k-1)!} k \cdot (2k-3)!! \\
& = [x_1^0 x_2^0 x_3^{n-1}]\left(\operatorname{Conv}_n\left(1, 1; \frac{x_3}{x_2}\right)
\operatorname{Conv}_n\left(2, 1; \frac{x_2}{x_1}\right)
\frac{(x_1+1) e^{x_1}}{(1-x_2)}\right),
\end{align}$$

where $I_0(z)$ denotes a modified Bessel function, $!n$ denotes the subfactorial function, $\operatorname{af}(n)$ denotes the alternating factorial function, and $P_n(x)$ is a Legendre polynomial. Other examples of sequences enumerated through applications of these rational Hadamard product generating functions given in the article include the Barnes G-function, combinatorial sums involving the double factorial function, sums of powers sequences, and sequences of binomials.

== Derivative transformations ==
=== Positive and negative-order zeta series transformations ===
For fixed $k \in \mathbb{Z}^{+}$, we have that if the sequence OGF $F(z)$ has $j^{th}$ derivatives of all required orders for $1 \leq j \leq k$, that the positive-order zeta series transformation is given by

$$\sum_{n \geq 0} n^k f_n z^n = \sum_{j=0}^{k} \left\{\begin{matrix} k \\ j \end{matrix} \right\} z^j F^{(j)}(z),$$

where
$$\scriptstyle{\left\{\begin{matrix} n \\ k \end{matrix} \right\}}$$
denotes a Stirling number of the second kind. In particular, we have the following special case identity when $f_n \equiv 1 \forall n$ when
$$\scriptstyle{\left\langle\begin{matrix} n \\ m \end{matrix} \right\rangle}$$
denotes the triangle of first-order Eulerian numbers:

$$\sum_{n \geq 0} n^k z^n = \sum_{j=0}^{k} \left\{\begin{matrix} k \\ j \end{matrix} \right\} \frac{z^j \cdot j!}{(1-z)^{j+1}} =
\frac{1}{(1-z)^{k+1}} \times \sum_{0 \leq m < k} \left\langle\begin{matrix} k \\ m \end{matrix} \right\rangle z^{m+1}.$$

We can also expand the negative-order zeta series transformations by a similar procedure to the above expansions given in terms of the $j^{th}$-order derivatives of some $F(z) \in C^{\infty}$ and an infinite, non-triangular set of generalized Stirling numbers in reverse, or generalized Stirling numbers of the second kind defined within this context.

In particular, for integers $k, j \geq 0$, define these generalized classes of Stirling numbers of the second kind by the formula

$$\left\{\begin{matrix} k+2 \\ j \end{matrix} \right\}_{\ast} := \frac{1}{j!} \times \sum_{m=1}^{j} \binom{j}{m} \frac{(-1)^{j-m}}{m^{k}}.$$

Then for $k \in \mathbb{Z}^{+}$ and some prescribed OGF, $F(z) \in C^{\infty}$, i.e., so that the higher-order $j^{th}$ derivatives of $F(z)$ exist for all $j \geq 0$, we have that

$$\sum_{n \geq 1} \frac{f_n}{n^k} z^n = \sum_{j \geq 1} \left\{\begin{matrix} k+2 \\ j \end{matrix} \right\}_{\ast} z^j F^{(j)}(z).$$

A table of the first few zeta series transformation coefficients,
$$\scriptstyle{\left\{\begin{matrix} k \\ j \end{matrix} \right\}_{\ast}}$$
, appears below. These weighted-harmonic-number expansions are almost identical to the known formulas for the Stirling numbers of the first kind up to the leading sign on the weighted harmonic number terms in the expansions.

| k | $$\left\{\begin{matrix} k \\ j \end{matrix} \right\}_{\ast} \times (-1)^{j-1} j!$$ |
|---|---|
| 2 | $1$ |
| 3 | $H_j$ |
| 4 | $\frac{1}{2}\left(H_j^2+H_j^{(2)}\right)$ |
| 5 | $\frac{1}{6}\left(H_j^3+3H_j H_j^{(2)} + 2 H_j^{(3)}\right)$ |
| 6 | $\frac{1}{24}\left(H_j^4+6H_j^2 H_j^{(2)} + 3\left(H_j^{(2)}\right)^2+ 8H_j H_j^{(3)}+ 6H_j^{(4)}\right)$ |

==== Examples of the negative-order zeta series transformations ====
The next series related to the polylogarithm functions (the dilogarithm and trilogarithm functions, respectively), the alternating zeta function and the Riemann zeta function are formulated from the previous negative-order series results found in the references. In particular, when $s := 2$ (or equivalently, when $k := 4$ in the table above), we have the following special case series for the dilogarithm and corresponding constant value of the alternating zeta function:

$$\begin{align}
\text{Li}_2(z) & = \sum_{j \geq 1} \frac{(-1)^{j-1}}{2} \left(H_j^2+H_j^{(2)}\right) \frac{z^j}{(1-z)^{j+1}} \\
\zeta^{\ast}(2) & = \frac{\pi^2}{12} = \sum_{j \geq 1} \frac{\left(H_j^2+H_j^{(2)}\right)}{4 \cdot 2^j}.
\end{align}$$

When $s := 3$ (or when $k := 5$ in the notation used in the previous subsection), we similarly obtain special case series for these functions given by

$$\begin{align}
\text{Li}_3(z) & = \sum_{j \geq 1} \frac{(-1)^{j-1}}{6} \left(H_j^3+3H_j H_j^{(2)} + 2 H_j^{(3)}\right) \frac{z^j}{(1-z)^{j+1}} \\
\zeta^{\ast}(3) & = \frac{3}{4} \zeta(3) = \sum_{j \geq 1} \frac{\left(H_j^3+3H_j H_j^{(2)} + 2 H_j^{(3)}\right)}{12 \cdot 2^j} \\
& = \frac{1}{6} \log(2)^3 + \sum_{j \geq 0} \frac{H_j H_j^{(2)}}{2^{j+1}}.
\end{align}$$

It is known that the first-order harmonic numbers have a closed-form exponential generating function expanded in terms of the natural logarithm, the incomplete gamma function, and the exponential integral given by

$$\sum_{n \geq 0} \frac{H_n}{n!} z^n = e^z \left( \mbox{E}_1(z) + \gamma + \log z\right) = e^z \left(\Gamma (0,z) + \gamma + \log z\right).$$

Additional series representations for the r-order harmonic number exponential generating functions for integers $r \geq 2$ are formed as special cases of these negative-order derivative-based series transformation results. For example, the second-order harmonic numbers have a corresponding exponential generating function expanded by the series

$$\sum_{n \geq 0} \frac{H_n^{(2)}}{n!} z^n =\sum_{j \geq 1} \frac{H_j^2+H_j^{(2)}}{2 \cdot (j+1)!} z^j e^z \left(j+1+z\right).$$

=== Generalized negative-order zeta series transformations ===
A further generalization of the negative-order series transformations defined above is related to more Hurwitz-zeta-like, or Lerch-transcendent-like, generating functions. Specifically, if we define the even more general parametrized Stirling numbers of the second kind by

$$\left\{\begin{matrix} k+2 \\ j \end{matrix} \right\}_{(\alpha, \beta)^{\ast}} := \frac{1}{j!} \times \sum_{0 \leq m \leq j} \binom{j}{m} \frac{(-1)^{j-m}}{(\alpha m+\beta)^{k}}$$,

for non-zero $\alpha, \beta \in \mathbb{C}$ such that $-\frac{\beta}{\alpha} \notin \mathbb{Z}^{+}$, and some fixed $k \geq 1$, we have that

$$\sum_{n \geq 1} \frac{f_n}{(\alpha n+\beta)^{k}} z^n = \sum_{j \geq 1} \left\{\begin{matrix} k+2 \\ j \end{matrix} \right\}_{(\alpha, \beta)^{\ast}} z^j F^{(j)}(z).$$

Moreover, for any integers $u, u_0 \geq 0$, we have the partial series approximations to the full infinite series in the previous equation given by

$$\sum_{n=1}^{u} \frac{f_n}{(\alpha n+\beta)^{k}} z^n = [w^u]\left(\sum_{j=1}^{u+u_0} \left\{\begin{matrix} k+2 \\ j \end{matrix} \right\}_{(\alpha, \beta)^{\ast}} \frac{(wz)^j F^{(j)}(wz)}{1-w}\right).$$

==== Examples of the generalized negative-order zeta series transformations ====
Series for special constants and zeta-related functions resulting from these generalized derivative-based series transformations typically involve the generalized r-order harmonic numbers defined by $H_n^{(r)}(\alpha, \beta) := \sum_{1 \leq k \leq n} (\alpha k + \beta)^{-r}$ for integers $r \geq 1$. A pair of particular series expansions for the following constants when $n \in \mathbb{Z}^{+}$ is fixed follow from special cases of BBP-type identities as

$$\begin{align}
\frac{4 \sqrt{3} \pi}{9} & = \sum_{j \geq 0} \frac{8}{9^{j+1}}\left(2 \binom{j+\frac{1}{3}}{\frac{1}{3}}^{-1} + \frac{1}{2} \binom{j+\frac{2}{3}}{\frac{2}{3}}^{-1}\right) \\
\log\left(\frac{n^2-n+1}{n^2}\right) & = \sum_{j \geq 0} \frac{1}{(n^2+1)^{j+1}}\left(\frac{2}{3 \cdot (j+1)} - n^2 \binom{j+\frac{1}{3}}{\frac{1}{3}}^{-1} + \frac{n}{2} \binom{j+\frac{2}{3}}{\frac{2}{3}}^{-1}\right).
\end{align}$$

Several other series for the zeta-function-related cases of the Legendre chi function, the polygamma function, and the Riemann zeta function include

$$\begin{align}
\chi_1(z) & = \sum_{j \geq 0} \binom{j+\frac{1}{2}}{\frac{1}{2}}^{-1} \frac{z \cdot (-z^2)^j}{(1-z^2)^{j+1}} \\
\chi_2(z) & = \sum_{j \geq 0} \binom{j+\frac{1}{2}}{\frac{1}{2}}^{-1} \left(1 + H_j^{(1)}(2, 1)\right) \frac{z \cdot (-z^2)^j}{(1-z^2)^{j+1}} \\
\sum_{k \geq 0} \frac{(-1)^k}{(z+k)^2} & = \sum_{j \geq 0} \binom{j+z}{z}^{-1} \left(\frac{1}{z^2} + \frac{1}{z} H_j^{(1)}(2, z)\right) \frac{1}{2^{j+1}} \\
\frac{13}{18} \zeta(3) & = \sum_{i=1,2} \sum_{j \geq 0} \binom{j+\frac{i}{3}}{\frac{i}{3}}^{-1} \left(\frac{1}{i^3} + \frac{1}{i^2} H_j^{(1)}(3, i) + \frac{1}{2i}\left(H_j^{(1)}(3, i)^2+H_j^{(2)}(3, i)\right)\right) \frac{(-1)^{i+1}}{2^{j+1}}.
\end{align}$$

Additionally, we can give another new explicit series representation of the inverse tangent function through its relation to the Fibonacci numbers expanded as in the references by

$$\tan^{-1}(x) = \frac{\sqrt{5}}{2\imath} \times \sum_{b = \pm 1} \sum_{j \geq 0} \frac{b}{\sqrt{5}} \binom{j+\frac{1}{2}}{j}^{-1}\left[
\frac{\left(b\imath\varphi t / \sqrt{5}\right)^j}{\left(1-\frac{b\imath\varphi t}{\sqrt{5}}\right)^{j+1}} -
\frac{\left(b\imath\Phi t / \sqrt{5}\right)^j}{\left(1+\frac{b\imath\Phi t}{\sqrt{5}}\right)^{j+1}}\right],$$

for $t \equiv 2x / \left(1+\sqrt{1+\frac{4}{5} x^2}\right)$ and where the golden ratio (and its reciprocal) are respectively defined by $\varphi,\Phi := \frac{1}{2}\left(1 \pm \sqrt{5}\right)$.

== Inversion relations and generating function identities ==
=== Inversion relations ===
An inversion relation is a pair of equations of the form

$$g_n = \sum_{k=0}^{n} A_{n,k} \cdot f_k \quad\longleftrightarrow\quad
f_n = \sum_{k=0}^{n} B_{n,k} \cdot g_k,$$

which is equivalent to the orthogonality relation

$$\sum_{k=j}^{n} A_{n,k} \cdot B_{k,j} = \delta_{n,j}.$$

Given two sequences, $\{f_n\}$ and $\{g_n\}$, related by an inverse relation of the previous form, we sometimes seek to relate the OGFs and EGFs of the pair of sequences by functional equations implied by the inversion relation. This goal in some respects mirrors the more number theoretic (Lambert series) generating function relation guaranteed by the Möbius inversion formula, which provides that whenever

$$a_n = \sum_{d | n} b_d \quad\longleftrightarrow\quad
b_n = \sum_{d | n} \mu\left(\frac{n}{d}\right) a_d,$$

the generating functions for the sequences, $\{a_n\}$ and $\{b_n\}$, are related by the Möbius transform given by

$$\sum_{n \geq 1} a_n z^n = \sum_{n \geq 1} \frac{b_n z^n}{1-z^n}.$$

Similarly, the Euler transform of generating functions for two sequences, $\{a_n\}$ and $\{b_n\}$, satisfying the relation

$$1 + \sum_{n \geq 1} b_n z^n = \prod_{i \geq 1} \frac{1}{(1-z^i)^{a_i}},$$

is given in the form of

$$1 + B(z) = \exp\left(\sum_{k \geq 1} \frac{A(z^k)}{k}\right),$$

where the corresponding inversion formulas between the two sequences is given in the reference.

The remainder of the results and examples given in this section sketch some of the more well-known generating function transformations provided by sequences related by inversion formulas (the binomial transform and the Stirling transform), and provides several tables of known inversion relations of various types cited in Riordan's Combinatorial Identities book. In many cases, we omit the corresponding functional equations implied by the inversion relationships between two sequences (this part of the article needs more work).

=== The binomial transform ===
The first inversion relation provided below implicit to the binomial transform is perhaps the simplest of all inversion relations we will consider in this section. For any two sequences, $\{f_n\}$ and $\{g_n\}$, related by the inversion formulas

$$g_n = \sum_{k=0}^{n} \binom{n}{k} (-1)^k f_k \quad\longleftrightarrow\quad
f_n = \sum_{k=0}^{n} \binom{n}{k} (-1)^k g_k,$$

we have functional equations between the OGFs and EGFs of these sequences provided by the binomial transform in the forms of

$$G(z) = \frac{1}{1-z} F\left(\frac{-z}{1-z}\right)$$

and

$$\widehat{G}(z) = e^z \widehat{F}(-z).$$

=== The Stirling transform ===
For any pair of sequences, $\{f_n\}$ and $\{g_n\}$, related by the Stirling number inversion formula

$$g_n = \sum_{k=1}^{n} \left\{\begin{matrix} n \\ k \end{matrix} \right\} f_k \quad\longleftrightarrow\quad
f_n = \sum_{k=1}^{n} \left[\begin{matrix} n \\ k \end{matrix} \right] (-1)^{n-k} g_k,$$

these inversion relations between the two sequences translate into functional equations between the sequence EGFs given by the Stirling transform as

$$\widehat{G}(z) = \widehat{F}\left(e^z-1\right)$$

and

$$\widehat{F}(z) = \widehat{G}\left(\log(1+z)\right).$$

=== Tables of inversion pairs from Riordan's book ===
These tables appear in chapters 2 and 3 in Riordan's book providing an introduction to inverse relations with many examples, though which does not stress functional equations between the generating functions of sequences related by these inversion relations. The interested reader is encouraged to pick up a copy of the original book for more details.

==== Several forms of the simplest inverse relations ====
| Relation | Formula | Inverse Formula | Generating Functions (OGF) | Generating Functions (EGF) | Notes / References |
|---|---|---|---|---|---|
| 1 | $a_n = \sum_{k=0}^n \binom{n}{k} b_k$ | $b_n = \sum_{k=0}^n \binom{n}{k} (-1)^{n-k} a_k$ | $B(z) = \frac{1}{1-z} A\left(-\frac{z}{1-z}\right)$ | $\widehat{B}(z) = e^z \widehat{A}(-z)$ | See the Binomial transform |
| 2 | $a_n = \sum_{k=0}^n \binom{p-k}{p-n} b_k$ | $b_n = \sum_{k=0}^n \binom{p-k}{p-n} (-1)^{n-k} a_k$ | $\ast$ | $\ast$ | |
| 3 | $a_n = \sum_{k=0}^n \binom{n+p}{k+p} b_k$ | $b_n = \sum_{k=0}^n \binom{n+p}{k+p} (-1)^{n-k} a_k$ | $B(z) = \frac{1}{(1+z)^{p+1}} A\left(\frac{z}{1+z}\right)$ | $\ast$ | |
| 4 | $a_n = \sum_{k\geq n} \binom{k+p}{n+p} b_k$ | $b_n = \sum_{k\geq n} \binom{k+p}{n+p} (-1)^{n-k} a_k$ | $\ast$ | $\ast$ | |
| 5 | $a_n = \sum_{k=1}^n \frac{n!}{k!} \binom{n-1}{k-1} b_k$ | $b_n = \sum_{k=1}^n \frac{n!}{k!} \binom{n-1}{k-1} (-1)^{n-k} a_k$ | $\ast$ | $\widehat{B}(z) = \widehat{A}\left(\frac{z}{1+z}\right)$ | |
| 6 | $a_n = \sum_{k=0}^n \binom{n}{k}^2 k! b_{n-k}$ | $b_n = \sum_{k=0}^n \binom{n}{k}^2 (-1)^k k! a_{n-k}$ | $\ast$ | $\widehat{B}(z) = \frac{1}{1+z} \widehat{A}\left(\frac{z}{1+z}\right)$ | |
| 7 | $\frac{n! a_n}{(n+p)!} = \sum_{k=0}^n \binom{n}{k} \frac{k! b_{k}}{(k+p)!}$ | $\frac{n! b_n}{(n+p)!} = \sum_{k=0}^n \binom{n}{k} \frac{(-1)^{n-k} k! a_{k}}{(k+p)!}$ | $B(z) = \frac{1}{(1+z)^{p+1}} A\left(\frac{z}{1+z}\right)$ | $\ast$ | |
| 8 | $s_n = \sum_{k \geq 0} \binom{n+k}{m+2k} a_k$ | $\ast$ | $S(z) = \frac{z^m}{(1-z)^{m+1}} A\left(\frac{z}{(1-z)^2}\right)$ | $\ast$ | See. |
| 9 | $a_n = \sum_{k=0}^n \binom{n}{k} a^k (-c)^{n-k} b_{k}$ | $\ast$ | $A(z) = \frac{1}{1+cx} B\left(\frac{ax}{1+cx}\right)$ | $\ast$ | Generalization of the binomial transform for $a,b,c \in \mathbb{C}$ such that $\left|\frac{ax}{1+cx}\right| < \sigma_B$. |
| 10 | $w_n = \sum_{i=0}^n \binom{n}{i} k^n a_i,\ k \neq 0$ | $\ast$ | $\ast$ | $\widehat{W}(A, k; z) = e^{kz} \widehat{A}(kz)$ | The $k$-binomial transform (see) |
| 11 | $f_n = \sum_{i=0}^n \binom{n}{i} k^{n-i} a_i,\ k \neq 0$ | $\ast$ | $\ast$ | $\widehat{F}(A, k; z) = e^{kz} \widehat{A}(z)$ | The falling $k$-binomial transform (refer to Spivey's article in) |
| 12 | $r_n = \sum_{i=0}^n \binom{n}{i} k^{i} a_i,\ k \neq 0$ | $\ast$ | $\ast$ | $\widehat{R}(A, k; z) = e^{z} \widehat{A}(kz)$ | The rising $k$-binomial transform (refer to Spivey's article in) |

==== Gould classes of inverse relations ====
The terms, $A_{n,k}$ and $B_{n,k}$, in the inversion formulas of the form

$$a_n = \sum_k A_{n,k} \cdot b_k \quad\longleftrightarrow\quad b_n = \sum_k B_{n,k} \cdot (-1)^{n-k} a_k,$$

forming several special cases of Gould classes of inverse relations are given in the next table.

| Class | $A_{n,k}$ | $B_{n,k}$ |
|---|---|---|
| 1 | $\binom{p+qk-k}{n-k}$ | $\binom{p+qn-k}{n-k}-q\binom{p+qn-k-1}{n-k-1}$ |
| 2 | $\binom{p+qk-k}{n-k}+q\binom{p+qk-k}{n-1-k}$ | $\binom{p+qn-k}{n-k}$ |
| 3 | $\binom{p+qn-n}{k-n}$ | $\binom{p+qk-n}{k-n}-q\binom{p+qk-n-1}{k-n-1}$ |
| 4 | $\binom{p+qn-n}{k-n}+q\binom{p+qn-n}{k-1-n}$ | $\binom{p+qk-n}{k-n}$ |

For classes 1 and 2, the range on the sum satisfies $k \in [0, n]$, and for classes 3 and 4 the bounds on the summation are given by $k=n,n+1,\ldots$. These terms are also somewhat simplified from their original forms in the table by the identities

$$\binom{p+qn-k}{n-k}-q \times \binom{p+qn-k-1}{n-k-1} = \frac{p+qk-k}{p+qn-k} \binom{p+qn-k}{n-k}$$
$$\binom{p+qk-k}{n-k}+q \times \binom{p+qk-k}{n-1-k} = \frac{p+qn-n+1}{p+qk-n+1} \binom{p+qk-k}{n-k}.$$

==== The simpler Chebyshev inverse relations ====
The so-termed simpler cases of the Chebyshev classes of inverse relations in the subsection below are given in the next table.

| Relation | Formula for $a_n$ | Inverse Formula for $b_n$ |
|---|---|---|
| 1 | $a_n = \sum_{k} \binom{n}{k} b_{n-2k}$ | $b_n = \sum_k \left[\binom{n-k}{k}+\binom{n-k-1}{k-1}\right] (-1)^k a_{n-2k}$ |
| 2 | $a_n = \sum_{k} \left[\binom{n}{k}-\binom{n}{k-1}\right] b_{n-2k}$ | $b_n = \sum_k \binom{n-k}{k} (-1)^k a_{n-2k}$ |
| 3 | $a_n = \sum_k \binom{n+2k}{k} b_{n+2k}$ | $b_n = \sum_k \left[\binom{n+k}{k}+\binom{n+k-1}{k-1}\right] (-1)^k a_{n+2k}$ |
| 4 | $a_n = \sum_k \left[\binom{n+2k}{k}-\binom{n+2k}{k-1}\right] b_{n+2k}$ | $b_n = \sum_k \binom{n+2k}{k} (-1)^k a_{n+2k}$ |
| 5 | $a_n = \sum_k \binom{n-k}{k} b_{n-k}$ | $b_n = \sum_k \left[\binom{n+k-1}{k}-\binom{n+k-1}{k-1}\right] (-1)^k a_{n-k}$ |
| 6 | $a_n = \sum_k \left[\binom{n+1-k}{k}+\binom{n-k}{k-1}\right] b_{n-k}$ | $b_n = \sum_k \binom{n+k}{k} (-1)^k a_{n-k}$ |
| 7 | $a_n = \sum_{k=0}^n \binom{n}{k} b_{n+ck}$ | $b_n = \sum_k \binom{n+ck+k}{k} \frac{n (-1)^k}{n+ck+k} a_{n+ck}$ |

The formulas in the table are simplified somewhat by the following identities:

$$\begin{align}
\binom{n-k}{k} + \binom{n-k-1}{k-1} & = \frac{n}{n-k} \binom{n-k}{k} \\
\binom{n}{k} - \binom{n}{k-1} & = \frac{n+1-k}{n+1-2k} \binom{n}{k} \\
\binom{n+2k}{k}-\binom{n+2k}{k-1} & = \frac{n+1}{n+1+k} \binom{n+2k}{k} \\
\binom{n+k-1}{k} - \binom{n+k-1}{k-1} & = \frac{n-k}{n+k} \binom{n+k}{k}.
\end{align}$$

Additionally the inversion relations given in the table also hold when $n \longmapsto n+p$ in any given relation.

==== Chebyshev classes of inverse relations ====
The terms, $A_{n,k}$ and $B_{n,k}$, in the inversion formulas of the form

$$a_n = \sum_k A_{n,k} \cdot b_{n+ck} \quad\longleftrightarrow\quad b_n = \sum_k B_{n,k} \cdot (-1)^{k} a_{n+ck},$$

for non-zero integers $c$ forming several special cases of Chebyshev classes of inverse relations are given in the next table.

| Class | $A_{n,k}$ | $B_{n,k}$ |
|---|---|---|
| 1 | $\binom{n}{k}$ | $\binom{n+ck+k}{k}-(c+1)\binom{n+ck+k-1}{k-1}$ |
| 2 | $\binom{n}{k}+(c+1)\binom{n}{k-1}$ | $\binom{n+ck+k}{k}$ |
| 3 | $\binom{n+ck}{k}$ | $\binom{n-1+k}{k}+c\binom{n-1+k}{k-1}$ |
| 4 | $\binom{n+ck}{k}-(c-1)\binom{n+ck}{k-1}$ | $\binom{n+k}{k}$ |

Additionally, these inversion relations also hold when $n \longmapsto n+p$ for some $p=0,1,2,\ldots,$ or when the sign factor of $(-1)^k$ is shifted from the terms $B_{n,k}$ to the terms $A_{n,k}$. The formulas given in the previous table are simplified somewhat by the identities

$$\begin{align}
\binom{n+ck+k}{k}-(c+1)\binom{n+ck+k-1}{k-1} & = \frac{n}{n+ck+k} \binom{n+ck+k}{k} \\
\binom{n}{k} + (c+1) \binom{n}{k-1} & = \frac{n+1+ck}{n+1-k} \binom{n}{k} \\
\binom{n-1+k}{k} + c \binom{n-1+k}{k-1} & = \frac{n+ck}{n} \binom{n-1+k}{k} \\
\binom{n+ck}{k} - (c-1) \binom{n+ck}{k-1} & = \frac{n+1}{n+1+ck-k} \binom{n+ck}{k}.
\end{align}$$

==== The simpler Legendre inverse relations ====
| Relation | Formula for $a_n$ | Inverse Formula for $b_n$ |
|---|---|---|
| 1 | $a_n = \sum_k \binom{n+p+k}{n-k} b_k$ | $b_n = \sum_k \left[\binom{2n+p}{n-k}-\binom{2n+p}{n-k-1}\right] (-1)^{n-k} a_k$ |
| 2 | $a_n = \sum_k \binom{2n+p}{n-k} b_k$ | $b_n = \sum_k \left[\binom{n+p+k}{n-k}-\binom{n+p+k-1}{n-k-1}\right] (-1)^{n-k} a_k$ |
| 3 | $a_n =\sum_{k\geq n} \binom{n+p+k}{k-n} b_k$ | $b_n = \sum_{k \geq n} \left[\binom{2k+p}{k-n}-\binom{2k+p}{k-n-1}\right] (-1)^{n-k} a_k$ |
| 4 | $a_n =\sum_{k\geq n} \binom{2k+p}{k-n} b_k$ | $b_n = \sum_{k \geq n} \left[\binom{n+p+k}{k-n}-\binom{n+p+k-1}{k-n-1}\right] (-1)^{n-k} a_k$ |
| 5 | $a_n = \sum_k \binom{2n+p}{k} b_{n-2k}$ | $b_n = \sum_k \left[\binom{2n+p-3k}{k}+3\binom{2n+p-3k-1}{k-1}\right] (-1)^k a_{n-2k}$ |
| 6 | $a_n = \sum_k \left[\binom{2n+p}{k} - 3 \binom{2n+p}{k-1}\right] b_{n-2k}$ | $b_n = \sum_k \binom{2n+p-3k}{k} (-1)^k a_{n-2k}$ |
| 7 | $a_n = \sum_{k=0}^{[n/2]} \binom{3n}{k} b_{n-2k}$ | $b_n = \sum_{k=0}^{[n/2]} \left[\binom{3n-5k}{k}+5\binom{3n-5k-1}{k-1}\right] (-1)^k a_{n-2k}$ |
| 8 | $a_n = \sum_{k=0}^{[n/3]} \binom{2n}{k} b_{n-3k}$ | $b_n = \sum_{k=0}^{[n/3]} \left[\binom{2n-5k}{k}+5\binom{2n-5k-1}{k-1}\right] (-1)^k a_{n-3k}$ |

==== Legendre–Chebyshev classes of inverse relations ====
The Legendre–Chebyshev classes of inverse relations correspond to inversion relations of the form

$$a_n = \sum_k A_{n,k} \cdot b_k \quad\longleftrightarrow\quad b_n = \sum_k B_{n,k} \cdot (-1)^{n-k} a_k,$$

where the terms, $A_{n,k}$ and $B_{n,k}$, implicitly depend on some fixed non-zero $c \in \mathbb{Z}$. In general, given a class of Chebyshev inverse pairs of the form

$$a_n = \sum_k A_{n,k} \cdot b_{n-ck} \quad\longleftrightarrow\quad b_n = \sum_k B_{n,k} \cdot (-1)^{k} a_{n-ck},$$

if $c$ a prime, the substitution of $n \longmapsto cn+p$, $a_{cn+p} \longmapsto A_n$, and $b_{cn+p} \longmapsto B_n$ (possibly replacing $k \longmapsto n-k$) leads to a Legendre–Chebyshev pair of the form

$$A_n = \sum_k A_{cn+p,k} B_{n-k} \quad\longleftrightarrow\quad B_n = \sum_k B_{cn+p,k} (-1)^k A_{n-k}.$$

Similarly, if the positive integer $c := d e$ is composite, we can derive inversion pairs of the form

$$A_n = \sum_k A_{dn+p,k} B_{n-ek} \quad\longleftrightarrow\quad B_n = \sum_k B_{dn+p,k} (-1)^k A_{n-ek}.$$

The next table summarizes several generalized classes of Legendre–Chebyshev inverse relations for some non-zero integer $c$.

| Class | $A_{n,k}$ | $B_{n,k}$ |
|---|---|---|
| 1 | $\binom{cn+p}{n-k}$ | $\binom{n+p-1+ck-k}{n-k}+c\binom{n+p-1+ck-k}{n-k-1}$ |
| 2 | $\binom{cn+p}{k-n}$ | $\binom{ck+k+p-n-1}{k-n}-c\binom{ck+k+p-n-1}{k-n-1}$ |
| 3 | $\binom{ck+p}{n-p}$ | $\binom{cn+n+p-k-1}{n-k}-c\binom{cn+n+p-k-1}{n-k-1}$ |
| 4 | $\binom{ck+p}{k-n}$ | $\binom{cn-n+p+k-1}{k-n}+c\binom{cn-n+p+k-1}{k-n-1}$ |
| 5 | $\binom{cn+p}{n-k}-(c-1)\binom{cn+p}{n-k-1}$ | $\binom{n+p+ck-k}{n-k}$ |
| 6 | $\binom{cn+p}{k-n}+(c+1)\binom{cn+p}{k-n-1}$ | $\binom{ck+k+p-n}{k-n}$ |
| 7 | $\binom{ck+p}{n-k}+(c+1)\binom{ck+p}{n-k-1}$ | $\binom{cn+n+p-k}{n-k}$ |
| 8 | $\binom{ck+p}{k-n}-(c-1)\binom{ck+p}{k-n-1}$ | $\binom{cn-n+p+k}{k-n}$ |

==== Abel inverse relations ====
Abel inverse relations correspond to Abel inverse pairs of the form

$$a_n = \sum_{k=0}^n \binom{n}{k} A_{nk} b_k \quad\longleftrightarrow\quad b_n = \sum_{k=0}^n \binom{n}{k} B_{nk}(-1)^{n-k} a_k,$$

where the terms, $A_{nk}$ and $B_{nk}$, may implicitly vary with some indeterminate summation parameter $x$. These relations also still hold if the binomial coefficient substitution of $\binom{n}{k} \longmapsto \binom{n+p}{k+p}$ is performed for some non-negative integer $p$. The next table summarizes several notable forms of these Abel inverse relations.

| Number | $A_{nk}$ | $B_{nk}$ | Generating Function Identity |
|---|---|---|---|
| 1 | $x (x+n-k)^{n-k-1}$ | $x (x-n+k)^{n-k-1}$ | $\ast$ |
| 2 | $(x+n-k)^{n-k}$ | $(x^2-n+k) (x-n+k)^{n-k-2}$ | $\ast$ |
| 3 | $(x+k)^{n-k}$ | $(x+k) (x+n)^{n-k-1}$ | $\ast$ |
| 3a | $(x+n) (x+k)^{n-k-1}$ | $(x+n)^{n-k}$ | $\ast$ |
| 4 | $(x+2n) (x+n+k)^{n-k-1}$ | $(x+2n) (x+n+k)^{n-k-1}$ | $\ast$ |
| 4a | $(x+2k) (x+n+k)^{n-k-1}$ | $(x+2k) (x+n+k)^{n-k-1}$ | $\ast$ |
| 5 | $(n+k)^{n-k}$ | $\left[n+k(4n-1)\right] (n+k)^{n-k-2}$ | $\ast$ |

==== Inverse relations derived from ordinary generating functions ====
If we let the convolved Fibonacci numbers, $f_k^{(\pm p)}$, be defined by

$$\begin{align}
f_n^{(p)} & = \sum_{j \geq 0} \binom{p+n-j-1}{n-j} \binom{n-j}{j} \\
f_n^{(-p)} & = \sum_{j \geq 0} \binom{p}{n+j} \binom{n-j}{j} (-1)^{n-j},
\end{align}$$

we have the next table of inverse relations which are obtained from properties of ordinary sequence generating functions proved as in section 3.3 of Riordan's book.

| Relation | Formula for $a_n$ | Inverse Formula for $b_n$ |
|---|---|---|
| 1 | $a_n = \sum_{k=0}^n \binom{p+k}{k} b_{n-k}$ | $b_n = \sum_{k=0}^n \binom{p+1}{k} (-1)^k a_{n-k}$ |
| 2 | $a_n = \sum_{k \geq 0} \binom{p+k}{k} b_{n-qk}$ | $b_n = \sum_k \binom{p+1}{k} (-1)^k a_{n-qk}$ |
| 3 | $a_n = \sum_{k=0}^{n} f_k^{(p)} b_{n-k}$ | $b_n = \sum_{k=0}^n f_k^{(-p)} a_{n-k}$ |
| 4 | $a_n = \sum_{k=0}^n \binom{2k}{k} b_{n-k}$ | $\sum_{k=0}^n \binom{2k}{k} \frac{a_{n-k}}{(1-2k)}$ |
| 5 | $a_n = \sum_{k=0}^n \binom{2k}{k} \frac{b_{n-k}}{(k+1)}$ | $b_n = a_n - \sum_{k=1}^n \binom{2k}{k} \frac{a_{n-k}}{k}$ |
| 6 | $a_n = \sum_{k=0}^n \binom{2p+2k}{p+k} \binom{p+k}{k} \binom{2p}{p}^{-1} b_{n-k}$ | $b_n = \sum_{k=0}^n \binom{2p+1}{2k} \binom{p+k}{k} \binom{p+k}{2k}^{-1} (-1)^k a_{n-k}$ |
| 7 | $a_n = \sum_k \binom{4k}{2k} b_{n-2k}$ | $b_n = \sum_k \binom{4k}{2k} \frac{(8k+1) a_{n-2k}}{(2k+1)(k+1)}$ |
| 8 | $a_n = \sum_k \binom{4k+2}{2k+1} b_{n-2k}$ | $b_n = \frac{a_n}{2} - \sum_{k \geq 1} \binom{4k-2}{2k-1} \frac{(8k-3) a_{n-2k}}{2k (4k-3)}$ |
| 9 | $a_n = \binom{4k}{2k} \frac{b_{n-2k}}{(1-4k)}$ | $b_n = \sum_k \binom{4k}{2k} \frac{a_{n-2k}}{(2k+1)}$ |

Note that relations 3, 4, 5, and 6 in the table may be transformed according to the substitutions $a_{n-k} \longmapsto a_{n-qk}$ and $b_{n-k} \longmapsto b_{n-qk}$ for some fixed non-zero integer $q \geq 1$.

==== Inverse relations derived from exponential generating functions ====
Let $B_n$ and $E_n$ denote the Bernoulli numbers and Euler numbers, respectively, and suppose that the sequences, $\{d_{2n}\}$, $\{e_{2n}\}$, and $\{f_{2n}\}$ are defined by the following exponential generating functions:

$$\begin{align}
\sum_{n \geq 0} \frac{d_{2n} z^{2n}}{(2n)!} & = \frac{2z}{e^z-e^{-z}} \\
\sum_{n \geq 0} \frac{e_{2n} z^{2n}}{(2n)!} & = \frac{z^2}{e^z+e^{-z}-2} \\
\sum_{n \geq 0} \frac{f_{2n} z^{2n}}{(2n)!} & = \frac{z^3}{3(e^z-e^{-z}-2z)}.
\end{align}$$

The next table summarizes several notable cases of inversion relations obtained from exponential generating functions in section 3.4 of Riordan's book.

| Relation | Formula for $a_n$ | Inverse Formula for $b_n$ |
|---|---|---|
| 1 | $a_n = \sum_{k=0}^n \binom{n}{k} \frac{b_k}{(k+1)}$ | $b_n = \sum_{k=0}^n B_k a_{n-k}$ |
| 2 | $a_n = \sum_k \binom{n+k}{k} \frac{b_{n+k}}{(k+1)}$ | $b_n = \sum_k \binom{n+k}{k} B_k a_{n+k}$ |
| 3 | $a_n = \sum_k \binom{n}{2k} b_{n-2k}$ | $b_n = \sum_k \binom{n}{2k} E_{2k} a_{n-2k}$ |
| 4 | $a_n = \sum_k \binom{n+2k}{2k} b_{n+2k}$ | $b_n = \sum_k \binom{n+2k}{2k} E_{2k} a_{n+2k}$ |
| 5 | $a_n = \sum_k \binom{n}{2k} \frac{b_{n-2k}}{(2k+1)}$ | $b_n = \sum_k \binom{n}{2k} d_{2k} a_{n-2k}$ |
| 6 | $a_n = \sum_k \binom{n+1}{2k+1} b_{n-2k}$ | $(n+1) \cdot b_n = \sum_k \binom{n+1}{2k} d_{2k} a_{n-2k}$ |
| 7 | $a_n = \sum_k \binom{n}{2k} \binom{2k+2}{2}^{-1} b_{n-2k}$ | $b_n = \sum_k \binom{n}{2k} e_{2k} a_{n-2k}$ |
| 8 | $a_n = \sum_k \binom{n+2}{2k+2} b_{n-2k}$ | $\binom{n+2}{2} \cdot b_n = \sum_k \binom{n+2}{2k} e_{2k} a_{n-2k}$ |
| 9 | $a_n = \sum_k \binom{n}{2k} \binom{2k+3}{3}^{-1} b_{n-2k}$ | $b_n = \sum_k \binom{n}{2k} f_{2k} a_{n-2k}$ |
| 10 | $a_n = \sum_k \binom{n+3}{2k+3} b_{n-2k}$ | $\binom{n+3}{3} \cdot b_n = \sum_k \binom{n+3}{2k} f_{2k} a_{n-2k}$ |

==== Multinomial inverses ====
The inverse relations used in formulating the binomial transform cited in the previous subsection are generalized to corresponding two-index inverse relations for sequences of two indices, and to multinomial inversion formulas for sequences of $j \geq 3$ indices involving the binomial coefficients in Riordan. In particular, we have the form of a two-index inverse relation given by

$$a_{mn} = \sum_{j=0}^m \sum_{k=0}^n \binom{m}{j} \binom{n}{k} (-1)^{j+k} b_{jk} \quad\longleftrightarrow\quad
b_{mn} = \sum_{j=0}^m \sum_{k=0}^n \binom{m}{j} \binom{n}{k} (-1)^{j+k} a_{jk},$$

and the more general form of a multinomial pair of inversion formulas given by

$$a_{n_1 n_2\cdots n_j} = \sum_{k_1, \ldots, k_j} \binom{n_1}{k_1} \cdots \binom{n_j}{k_j} (-1)^{k_1+\cdots+k_j}
b_{k_1 k_2 \cdots k_j} \quad\longleftrightarrow\quad
b_{n_1 n_2\cdots n_j} = \sum_{k_1, \ldots, k_j} \binom{n_1}{k_1} \cdots \binom{n_j}{k_j} (-1)^{k_1+\cdots+k_j}
a_{k_1 k_2 \cdots k_j}.$$
