= List of things named after Pafnuty Chebyshev =

== Mathematics ==
- Chebyshev center
- Chebyshev constants
- Chebyshev cube root
- Chebyshev distance
- Chebyshev equation
- Chebyshev's equioscillation theorem
- Chebyshev filter, a family of analog filters in electronics and signal processing
- Chebyshev function in number theory
- Chebyshev integral
- Chebyshev iteration
- Chebyshev method
- Chebyshev nodes
- Chebyshev polynomials and the "Chebyshev form"
  - Chebyshev norm
  - Discrete Chebyshev polynomials
  - Discrete Chebyshev transform
- Chebyshev rational functions
- Chebyshev–Gauss quadrature
- Chebyshev–Markov–Stieltjes inequalities
- Chebyshev's bias
- Chebyshev's inequality in probability and statistics
  - Chebyshev–Cantelli inequality
  - Multidimensional Chebyshev's inequality
- Chebyshev pseudospectral method
- Chebyshev space
- Chebyshev's sum inequality
- Chebyshev's theorem (disambiguation)

== Mechanics ==
- Chebyshev linkage, a straight line generating linkage
- Chebyshev's Lambda Mechanism and Translating Table Linkage
- Chebychev–Grübler–Kutzbach criterion for the mobility analysis of linkages
- Roberts–Chebyshev theorem on the generation of cognate coupler-curves.

== Other ==
- Chebyshev (crater)
- 2010 Chebyshev, asteroid
