= Dmitry Morduhai-Boltovskoi =

Russian mathematician

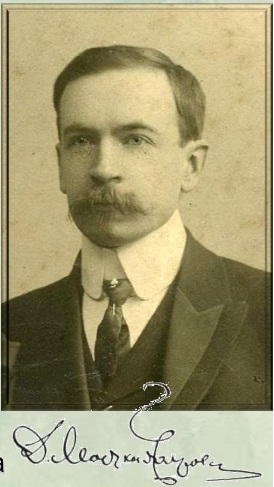
D.D.Morduhai-Boltovskoi (1876–1952)

Dmitry Dmitrievich Morduhai-Boltovskoi (Russian: Дми́трий Дми́триевич Мордуха́й-Болтовско́й; Pavlovsk, August 8, 1876 – Rostov-on-Don, February 7, 1952) was a Russian mathematician, best known for his work in analysis, differential Galois theory, number theory, hyperbolic geometry, and history of mathematics. His annotated translation of Euclid's Elements in Russian is also well-regarded.

== Biography ==
Morduhai-Boltovskoi, a descendant of a Russian noble family, was born in 1876 in Pavlovsk, near Saint Petersburg. His father was a railroad engineer and high-ranking official in the Imperial Russian transportation ministry, and his grandfather was a general. In 1894 he entered St. Petersburg University where he attended courses by Andrey Markov, Aleksandr Korkin, Julian Sochocki and Dmitry Grave. He finished his dissertation under Konstantin Posse in 1898 and started in Warsaw Politechnic Institute. He continued to work in Warsaw alongside Georgy Voronoy, and became a professor at Warsaw University in 1914. In 1915, after Germany captured Warsaw in World War I, parts of Warsaw University were evacuated, and Morduhai-Boltovskoi with colleagues started working at Rostov University. He continued living in Rostov and working there until 1945, and from 1947 to 1950. In 1943–1945 and 1950–1952 he worked in Pyatigorsk, and in 1945–1947 — in Ivanovo.

Morduhai-Boltovskoi was the founder of mathematics research in Rostov. His students included Boris Levin and Nikolai Efimov. His son, Filaret Dmitrievich, was one of the leading Russian experts in hydrobiology.

== Literary references ==
Dmitry Dmitrievich Morduhai-Boltovskoi was a model for a character of Professor Dmitri Dmitrievich Goryainov-Shakhovskoy in Aleksandr Solzhenitsyn's novel The First Circle. Solzhenitsyn was his student at Rostov University.
