= Dmitry Grave =

Russian and Soviet mathematician

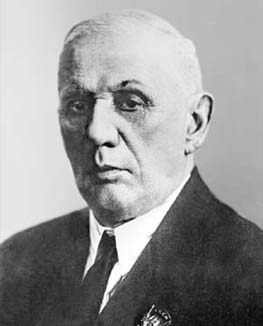
- Born: 6 September 1863; Kirillov, Kirillovsky Uyezd, Novgorod Governorate, Russian Empire
- Died: 19 December 1939 (aged 76); Kyiv, Ukraine SSR, Soviet Union
- Education: St. Petersburg State University
- Scientific career
- Fields: Mathematics
- Workplaces: Kyiv State University
- Doctoral advisor: Aleksandr Korkin
- Doctoral students: Naum Akhiezer; Nikolai Chebotaryov; Boris Delaunay; Mikhail Kravchuk; Otto Schmidt; Yurii Sokolov

Dmytro Oleksandrovych Grave (Ukrainian: Дмитро Олександрович Граве, Russian: Дми́трий Алекса́ндрович Гра́ве; 6 September 1863 – 19 December 1939) was a Ukrainian, Russian and Soviet mathematician.

Naum Akhiezer, Nikolai Chebotaryov, Mikhailo Kravchuk, and Boris Delaunay were among his students.

== Biography ==
Dmitry Grave was educated at the University of St Petersburg where he studied under Chebyshev and his students Korkin, Zolotarev and Markov. Grave began research while a student, graduating with his doctorate in 1896. He had obtained his master's degree in 1889 and, in that year, began teaching at the University of St Petersburg.

For his master's degree Grave studied Jacobi's methods for the three-body problem, a topic suggested by Korkin. His doctorate was on map projections, again a topic proposed by Korkin, the degree being awarded in 1896. The work, on equal area plane projections of the sphere, built on ideas of Euler, Joseph Louis Lagrange and Chebyshev.

Grave became professor at Kharkiv University in 1897 (Kharkiv, Ukraine) and, from 1902, he was appointed professor at the Kyiv University, where he remained for the rest of his life. Grave is considered as the founder of the Kyiv school of algebra which was to become the centre for algebra in the Ukrainian Soviet Socialist Republic.

Grave studied algebra and number theory in Kyiv, and worked on Galois theory, ideals and equations of the fifth degree. Among his pupils were Otto Schmidt, Nikolai Chebotaryov, Boris Delaunay and Alexander Ostrowski.

The Revolution of 1917 had some major effects on the development of mathematics in Russia and Ukraine. One effect was that mathematics in Ukraine was required to be more practical and algebra did not fit into this applied mathematics and technology dominated scene. Grave had to discontinue his famous Kyiv algebra seminar in the 1920s, give up teaching and research in algebra, and move to applied mathematics topics. It would not be before the 1950s, well after Grave's death, that Kyiv would again play a major role in algebra research.

Grave chaired the Applied Mathematics Commission of the Academy of Sciences of Ukraine in the 1920s. After Grave stopped work on algebra, he began to study mechanics and applied mathematics, but he never completely gave up algebra.

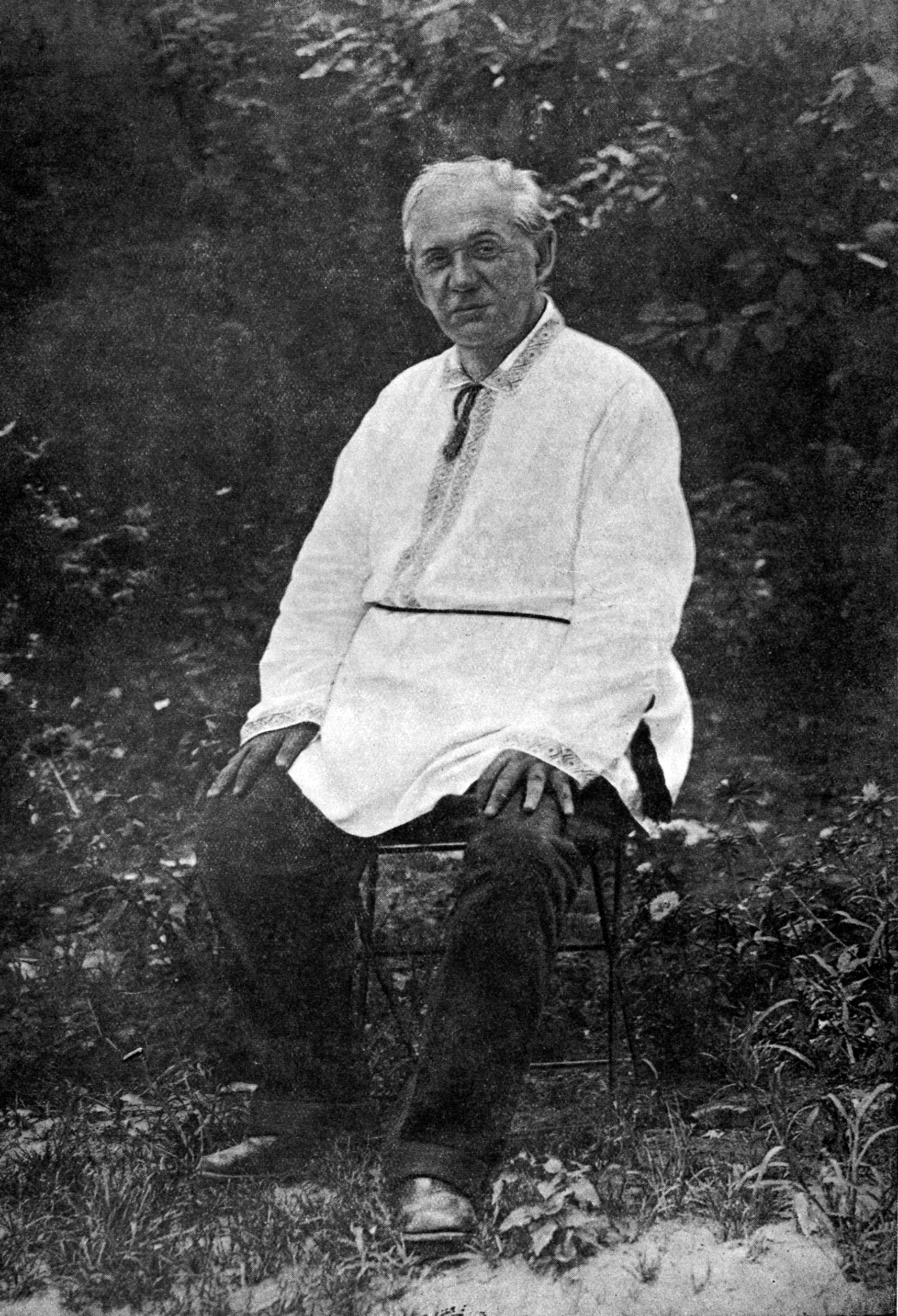
Grave in 1936

During the 1930s there were further changes to the Soviet educational system, and there was a fair amount of reorganisation. The NASU Institute of Mathematics was founded in Kyiv in 1934 and Grave served as the first director of the Institute from its foundation until his death in 1939. His work at the Institute of Mathematics was in addition to his chair at Kyiv University which he continued to hold.

Among the many books that Grave wrote were Theory of Finite Groups (1910) and A Course in Algebraic Analysis (1932). He also studied the history of algebraic analysis.

Among the honours that were given to him was election to the Academy of Sciences of Ukraine in 1919, election to the Shevchenko Scientific Society in 1923 and election to the Academy of Sciences of the USSR in 1929.
