= Andrey Markov =

Russian mathematician (1856–1922)

- Андрей Марков
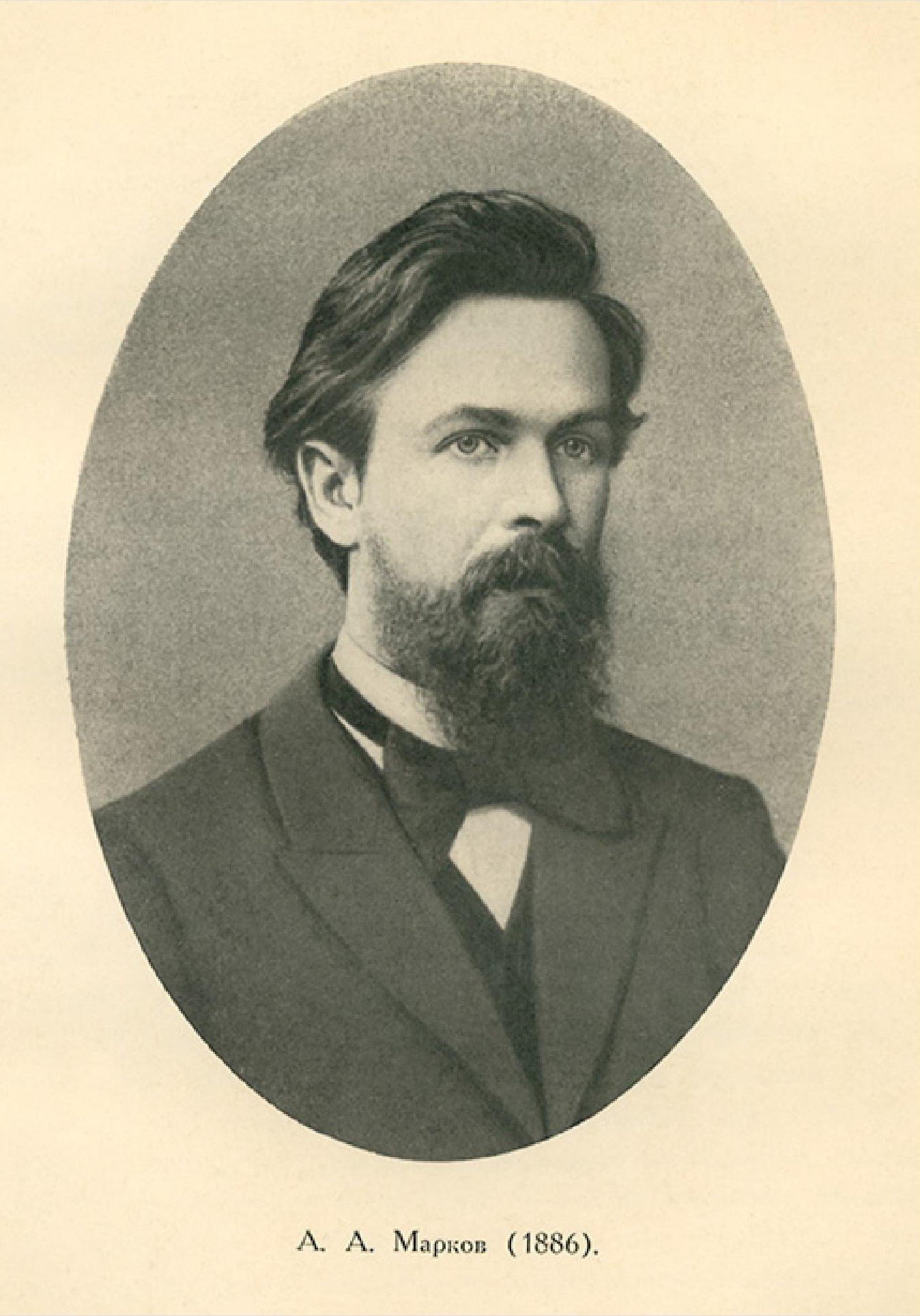
- Markov in 1886
- Born: 14 June 1856; Ryazan, Russia
- Died: 20 July 1922 (aged 66); Petrograd, Russia
- Education: St. Petersburg University
- Known for: Markov chains Markov processes Stochastic processes
- Children: Andrey Markov Jr.
- Scientific career
- Fields: Mathematics, specifically probability theory and statistics
- Workplaces: St. Petersburg University
- Doctoral advisor: Pafnuty Chebyshev
- Doctoral students: Abram Besicovitch; Nikolai Günther; Veniamin Kagan; V. I. Romanovsky; Jacob Tamarkin; J. V. Uspensky; Georgy Voronoy

Andrey Andreyevich Markov (Note: (Russian: Андре́й Андре́евич Ма́рков, first name also spelled "Andrei", in older works also spelled Markoff)) (14 June [O.S. 2 June] 1856 – 20 July 1922) was a Russian mathematician celebrated for his pioneering work in stochastic processes. He extended foundational results—such as the law of large numbers and the central limit theorem—to sequences of dependent random variables, laying the groundwork for what would become known as Markov chains. To illustrate his methods, he analyzed the distribution of vowels and consonants in Alexander Pushkin's Eugene Onegin, treating letters purely as abstract categories and stripping away any poetic or semantic content.

He was also a strong chess player.

Markov and his younger brother Vladimir Andreyevich Markov (1871–1897) proved the Markov brothers' inequality. His son, another Andrey Andreyevich Markov (1903–1979), was also a notable mathematician, making contributions to constructive mathematics and recursive function theory.

== Biography ==
Andrey Markov was born on 14 June 1856 in Ryazan, Russia. He attended the St. Petersburg Grammar School, where some teachers saw him as a rebellious student. In his academics he performed poorly in most subjects other than mathematics. Later in life he attended Saint Petersburg Imperial University. Among his teachers were Yulian Sokhotski (differential calculus, higher algebra), Konstantin Posse (analytic geometry), Yegor Zolotarev (integral calculus), Pafnuty Chebyshev (number theory and probability theory), Aleksandr Korkin (ordinary and partial differential equations), Mikhail Okatov (mechanism theory), Osip Somov (mechanics), and Nikolai Budajev (descriptive and higher geometry).

He completed his studies at the university and was later asked if he would like to stay and have a career as a mathematician. He later taught at high schools and continued his own mathematical studies. In this time he found a practical use for his mathematical skills.

In 1913, he conducted a study on the distribution of vowels and consonants in the first 20,000 letters of Alexander Pushkin's Eugene Onegin, treating the text as a sequence of symbols and analyzing the statistical relationships between them. By classifying each letter as either a vowel or a consonant and analyzing the probabilities of transitions between these categories, Markov demonstrated that chains of dependent events could be rigorously modeled. This was the first empirical application of what are now called Markov chains.

He died at age 66 on 20 July 1922.

== Timeline ==
In 1877, Markov was awarded a gold medal for his outstanding solution of the problem:

About Integration of Differential Equations by Continued Fractions with an Application to the Equation $(1+x^2) \frac{dy}{dx} = n (1+y^2)$.

During the following year, he passed the candidate's examinations, and he remained at the university to prepare for a lecturer's position.

In April 1880, Markov defended his master's thesis "On the Binary Square Forms with Positive Determinant", which was directed by Aleksandr Korkin and Yegor Zolotarev. Four years later in 1884, he defended his doctoral thesis titled "On Certain Applications of the Algebraic Continuous Fractions".

His pedagogical work began after the defense of his master's thesis in autumn 1880. As a privatdozent he lectured on differential and integral calculus. Later he lectured alternately on "introduction to analysis", probability theory (succeeding Chebyshev, who had left the university in 1882) and the calculus of differences. From 1895 through 1905 he also lectured in differential calculus.

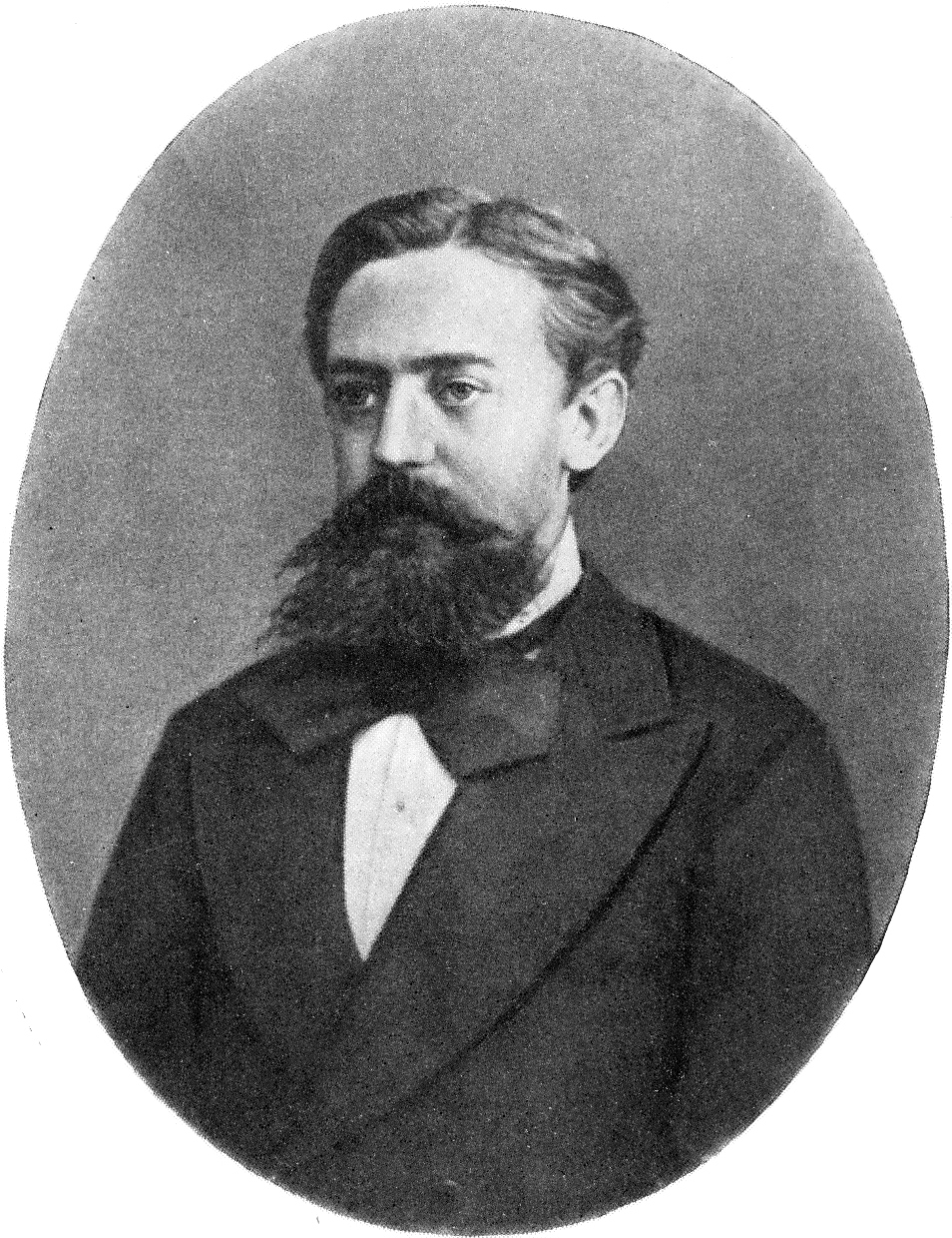
Markov

One year after the defense of his doctoral thesis, Markov was appointed extraordinary professor (1886) and in the same year he was elected adjunct to the Academy of Sciences. In 1890, after the death of Viktor Bunyakovsky, Markov became an extraordinary member of the academy. His promotion to an ordinary professor of St. Petersburg University followed in the fall of 1894.

In 1896, Markov was elected an ordinary member of the academy as the successor of Chebyshev. In 1905, he was appointed merited professor and was granted the right to retire, which he did immediately. Until 1910, however, he continued to lecture in the calculus of differences.

In connection with student riots in 1908, professors and lecturers of St. Petersburg University were ordered to monitor their students. Markov refused to accept this decree, and he wrote an explanation in which he declined to be an "agent of the governance". Markov was removed from further teaching duties at St. Petersburg University, and hence he decided to retire from the university.

Markov was an atheist. In 1912, he responded to Leo Tolstoy's excommunication from the Russian Orthodox Church by requesting his own excommunication. The Church complied with his request.

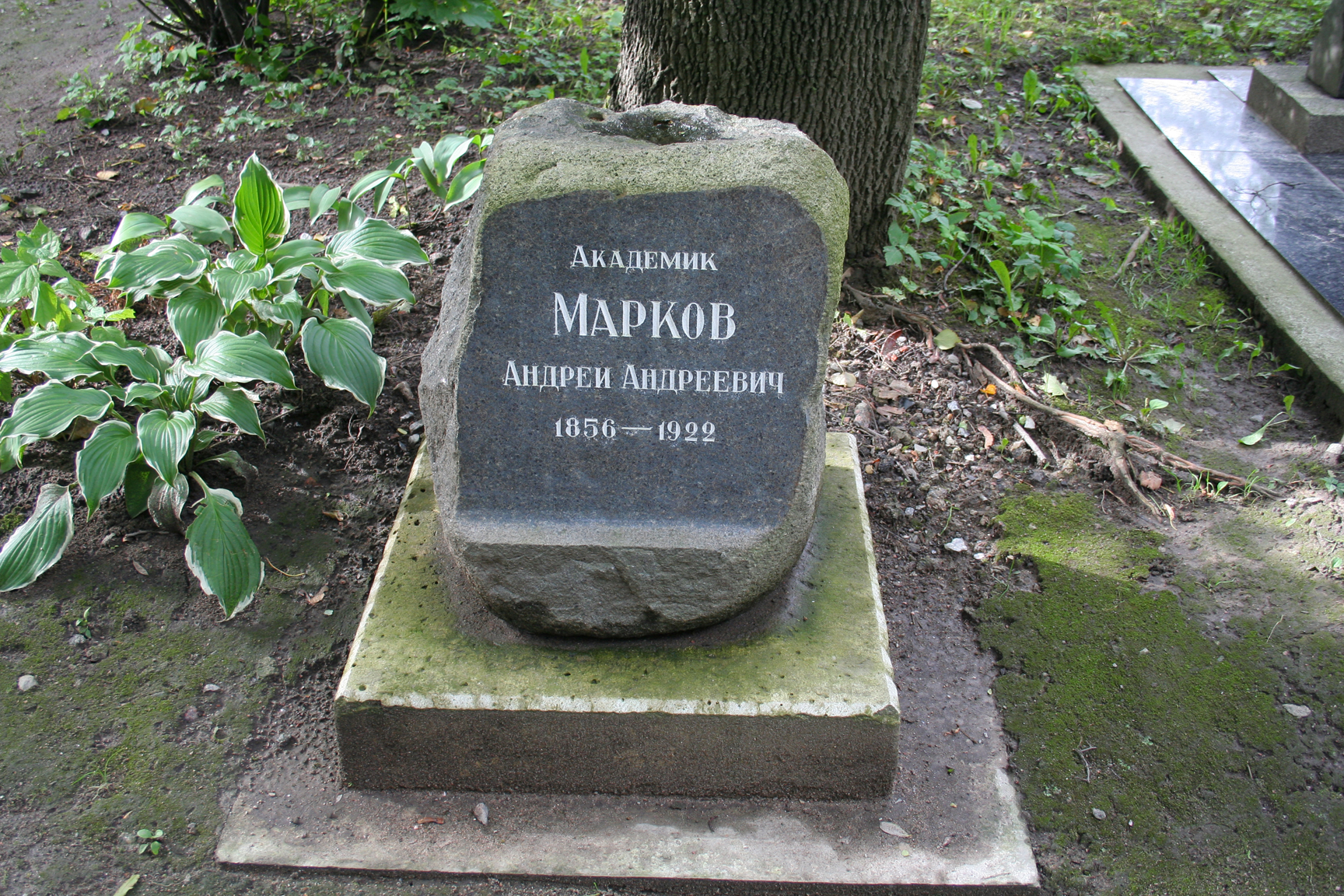
Markov's headstone

In 1913, the council of St. Petersburg elected nine scientists honorary members of the university. Markov was among them, but his election was not affirmed by the minister of education. The affirmation only occurred four years later, after the February Revolution in 1917. Markov then resumed his teaching activities and lectured on probability theory and the calculus of differences until his death in 1922.

== See also ==
- List of things named after Andrey Markov
- Chebyshev–Markov–Stieltjes inequalities
- Gauss–Markov theorem
- Gauss–Markov process
- Hidden Markov model
- Markov blanket
- Markov chain
- Markov decision process
- Markov's inequality
- Markov brothers' inequality
- Markov information source
- Markov network
- Markov number
- Markov property
- Stochastic matrix (also known as Markov matrix)
- Subjunctive possibility

== Sources ==
- "Марков, Андрей Андреевич" . Brockhaus and Efron Encyclopedic Dictionary (in Russian). 1906.
