= Somov =

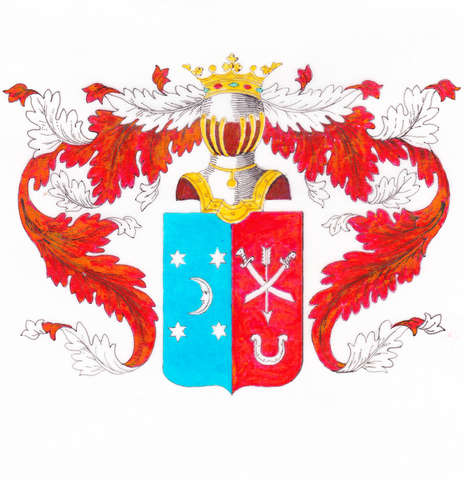
Somov Family Coat of Arms

The House of Somov (Russian: Сомовы), also known as Somoff or Somow, is a Russian noble family descended from the Khans of the 14th century.

== Ancestry ==
The House of Somov is descendant from Prince (Mirza) Oslan-Chelebey. Oslan left the Golden Horde to lead an army supporting the Prince of Moscow Dmitry Donskoy during wars with other principalities and against Tartar domination. He was baptized in 1389 and given the name Prokofiev. He went on to marry the daughter of Prince Dimitri's Stolnik (Zotik Zhitov), Maria Zotikova Zhitova.

Together, they had five sons: Lev (nicknamed 'Wide Mouth'), Fiodr, Arseny (founder of the Arseniev family; Russian: Арсеньевы), Jacob Kremenetsky (founder of the Kremenetsky and Yanovtsevyh family), and Paul (founder of the Pavlovs family).

Their son, Lev Prokofievich, had two sons himself: Zechariah (founder of the Rtishev, Russian: Ртищевы, and Zhdanovs families) and Andrey (nicknamed "Som", Catfish, and founder of the Somov family).

== Notable members ==
=== Fyodor Ivanovich Somov ===
Fyodor was Voevoda of Verhoturie (1619) and his brother Ivan was Voevoda of Kozelsk and Lihvina (1616-1619). Son of the last Fyodor, he was a Voevoda of Yelets Sviyazhsk and Ufa (1650-1664).

=== Parfeny Pavlovich Somov ===
Parfeny was a Voevoda of Vahe (1666) and Lomov (1676) and, later, the clerk of the Russian Council (Russian: Думный дворянин).

=== Matvei Petrovich Somov ===
Matvei was a steward and Voevoda in Viazma (1679).

=== Feodosia Pavlovna Somova (1650?) ===
Feodosia was the daughter of Pavel Stepanovich and Maria Verigin (Princess Volkonsky´s daughter) and the mother of Eudoxia Alexeievna Chirikova (d. 1703), wife of the first Count of the Russian Empire, Boris Sheremetev. She is the ancestor of various nobles and princely Russian families, including: Count Mikhail Borisovich Sheremetev, Princess Sofía Borisovna Urusov (Khanate of Nogai), Countess Ana Borisovna Golovin, the House of Dolgorukov family, the Apraxine family, and the Naryshkin family.

=== Evsievy Leontievich Somov (1692) ===
Evsievy was the Stolnik of Tsaritsa for Natalya Kirillovna Naryshkina, the second spouse of Tsar Alexei Mikhailovich.

=== Nadiezhda Petrovna Somova (b. 1730) ===
Nadieshda was Princess Dolgorukova and married to Prince Ivan Aleksievich Dolgorukov (Russian: Долгоруковы) (d. 1783).

=== Andrey Andreievich Somov (d. 1815) ===
Andrey was a Major General and hero of the Battle of Eylau during the War of the Fourth Coalition of the Napoleonic Wars. He served in the infantry during his 1775 military service. In 1790, he received the rank of Second Major. In 1794, he was promoted to Prime Major; and in 1797, he was promoted to Lieutenant Colonel. On October 3rd, 1798, Colonel Somov was the chief of the Kamchatka Garrison Battalion and on June 8th, 1799 received the rank of Major General. On the 21st of January 1803, Somov was appointed chief of the Tula Musketeer Regiment (1806-1807), which fought against the French Army in Eastern Prussia.At the 1807 Battle of Eylau, he commanded a brigade composed of the Polotsk, Tobolsk and Tula Musketeer Regiments and pushed the French out of the city.

On 8 April 1807, he was awarded the Order of St. George, third degree (No. 149 by Chevalier list) as a, “great reward of bravery and courage, rendered in the battle against the French troops of the 26th and 27th of January at Eylau.”For other actions in the war Somov was awarded a gold sword with the inscription “For Bravery” on December 1, 1807. Somov retired in 1809 and died in 1815.

=== Juliana Fedorovna Somova (1815–1856) ===
Juliana was Princess Galitzina, married to Prince Nikolai Borisovich Galitzine (1802–1876).

=== Afanasy Nikoaievich Somov (1823–1899) ===
Afanasy was a Senator and Governor of Tver.

=== Andrey Ivanovich Somov (1830–1909) ===
Andrey Ivanovich was an art historian, museum worker, and collector. He graduated from Larin's Gymnasium in St. Petersburg, his city of birth, and the Department of Physics and Mathematics of St. Petersburg University (1854). He also attended classes at the Drawing School. After his schooling, he taught physics and mathematics until 1859. That year, he published the first accessible description of the art galleries of the Hermitage Museum. From 1872 to 1886, he issued a catalog of the art gallery of the Academy of Arts. He managed the office of the St. Petersburg Academy of Sciences from 1863 to 1886 and taught art history at the Higher Women's Courses (Bestuzhev Courses) from 1883 to 1889. From 1883 to 1890, Somov edited the Vestnik Izyaschnykh Iskusstv (Fine Arts Herald) journal. In 1878, he was elected a Fellow of the Society for the Encouragement of the Arts.

In 1886, he assumed the post of Chief Custodian of the art gallery of the Hermitage; during his tenure, he compiled a scientific catalog of the gallery (Vol. 1–3, 1889–95) and made a considerable contribution to the evolution of domestic museology and art.

Somov gathered a notable collection of art pieces and porcelain during his life and lived in his own house at 97 Ekaterininsky Canal Embankment (present-day Griboedova Canal Embankment). He died in 1909 and was buried at Novodevichye Cemetery in Moscow. His son was an artist, K.A. Somov.

=== Sergey Mikhailovich Somov (1854–1917) ===
Sergey was Chamberlain of the Imperial Court, and was the last Marshal of Nobility of Saint Petersburg. He was Afanasy Nikolaievich's nephew.

His son, Sergey Sergeievich Somov, and his wife, Natalia Vasilievna Naryshkin, hid a valuable treasure in the Naryshkin-Trubetskoy Palace before immigrating to France. In April 2012, the treasure was found by workers who were restoring the palace. Members of the Naryshkin and Somov family claimed it.

=== Eudoxia Mihailovna Somova (1850–Nice, France 1924) ===
Eudoxia was born in 1850 in Alexandrovsk-Lugansk. She was 1st Princess of Orbeliani (widow of Alexander Orbeliani) and 2nd Princess of Murat, marrying Prince Louis Napoléon Murat, grandson of Joachim Murat. She was the daughter of Cap. Mihail Alexandrovich Somov (Marshal of Nobility) and Princess Maria Pavlovna Chirinsky-Chikhmatov (of the Crimean Khanate).

=== Others ===
- Konstantin Somov (1869–1939), Russian painter.
- Mikhail Mikhailovich Somov (1908–1973), Soviet oceanographer.
- Orest Somov (1793–1833), Russian writer.
- Osip Ivanovich Somov (1815–1876), Russian mathematician.
- Iwaniec Ivanovic Somov is written about in the book of the best-thousand nobles and knights (1550).
- Three Somovs were killed by the Polish in the Time of Troubles.

== Princes Shekhonskie-Somov ==
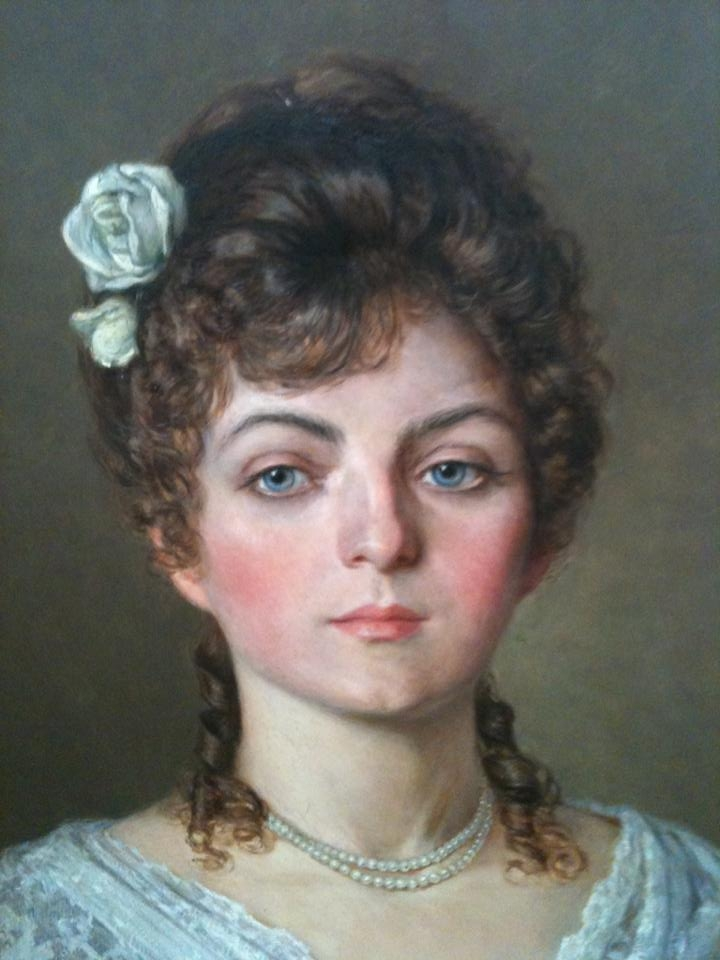
Portrait Inna Andr. Somov, Baroness v. Sobeck-Skal u. Kornitz. Paint. Zdrazila, Adolf (1920) Opava

The Shekhonskie-Somov family was an extinct princely family, originating from the Yaroslavl Princes of the Principality of Yaroslavl branch. According to P.N. Petrov's research, the Somov family descends from Shekhonskie princes, refuting the origins theory related to Prince Oslan-Chelebey.

The Somov family is divided into several branches and is listed in genealogical records of the Voronezh, Ekaterinoslav, Kazan, Kaluga, Kursk, Moscow, Novgorod, Orel, Saratov, Smolensk, Tambov, Tver, Tula, and Kharkov provinces. The Somov heraldry was included in the Armorial General of the Nobility of the Russian Empire (chapter IV, 110).
