= Chebotarev theorem on roots of unity =

All submatrices of a discrete Fourier transform matrix of prime length are invertible

The Chebotarev theorem on roots of unity was originally a conjecture made by Ostrowski in the context of lacunary series.

Chebotarev was the first to prove it, in the 1930s. This proof involves tools from Galois theory and pleased Ostrowski, who made comments arguing that it "does meet the requirements of mathematical esthetics". Several proofs have been proposed since, and it has even been discovered independently by Dieudonné.

== Statement ==
Let $\Omega$ be a matrix with entries $a_{ij} =\omega^{ij},1\leq i,j\leq n$, where $\omega =e^{2\mathrm i\pi / n},n\in \mathbb{N}$. If $n$ is prime then any minor of $\Omega$ is non-zero.

Equivalently, all submatrices of a DFT matrix of prime length are invertible.

== Applications ==
In signal processing, the theorem was used by T. Tao to extend the uncertainty principle.
