= Thomas Joannes Stieltjes =

Dutch mathematician (1856–1894)

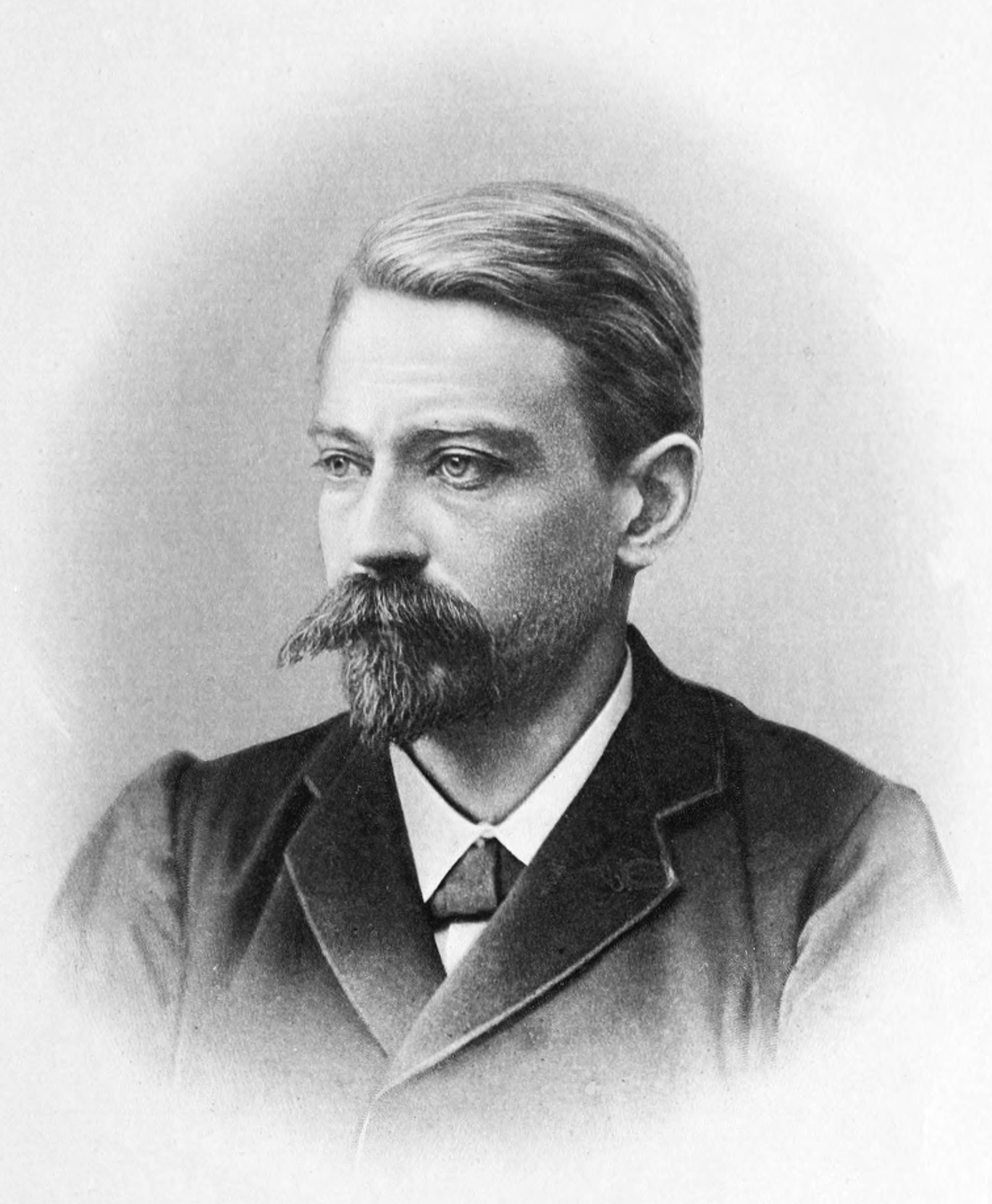
- Born: 29 December 1856; Zwolle, Netherlands
- Died: 31 December 1894 (aged 38); Toulouse, France
- Education: École Normale Supérieure
- Known for: Riemann–Stieltjes integral; Lebesgue–Stieltjes integration; Lebesgue-Stieltjes measure; Stieltjes constants; Stieltjes matrix; Stieltjes transformation; Stieltjes polynomials; Laplace–Stieltjes transform; Stieltjes–Wigert polynomials; Chebyshev–Markov–Stieltjes inequalities; Heine–Stieltjes polynomials; Stieltjes moment problem; Fourier-Stieltjes algebra; Henstock-Kurzweil-Stieltjes integral; Mertens conjecture; Stieltjes–Osgood theorem
- Scientific career
- Fields: Mathematics
- Workplaces: TU Delft; University of Leiden
- Thesis: Recherches sur quelques séries semi-convergentes (1886)
- Doctoral advisor: Charles Hermite; Jean Gaston Darboux

Thomas Joannes Stieltjes (/ˈstiːltʃəz/ STEEL-chəz, Dutch: [ˈtoːmɑ ˈstiltɕəs]; 29 December 1856 – 31 December 1894) was a Dutch mathematician. He was a pioneer in the field of moment problems and contributed to the study of continued fractions. The Thomas Stieltjes Institute for Mathematics at Leiden University, dissolved in 2011, was named after him, as is the Riemann–Stieltjes integral.

== Biography ==
Stieltjes was born in Zwolle on 29 December 1856. His father (who had the same first names) was a civil engineer and politician. Stieltjes Sr. was responsible for the construction of various harbours around Rotterdam, and also seated in the Dutch parliament. Stieltjes Jr. went to university at the Polytechnical School in Delft in 1873. Instead of attending lectures, he spent his student years reading the works of Gauss and Jacobi — the consequence of this being he failed his examinations. There were two further failures (in 1875 and 1876), and his father despaired. His father was friends with H. G. van de Sande Bakhuyzen (who was the director of Leiden University), and Stieltjes Jr. was able to get a job as an assistant at Leiden Observatory.

Soon afterwards, Stieltjes began a correspondence with Charles Hermite which lasted for the rest of his life. He originally wrote to Hermite concerning celestial mechanics, but the subject quickly turned to mathematics and he began to devote his spare time to mathematical research.

The director of Leiden Observatory, van de Sande-Bakhuyzen, responded quickly to Stieltjes' request on 1 January 1883 to stop his observational work to allow him to work more on mathematical topics. In 1883, he also married Elizabeth Intveld in May. She, too, encouraged him to move from astronomy to mathematics. And in September, Stieltjes was asked to substitute at University of Delft for F.J. van den Berg. From then until December of that year, he lectured on analytical geometry and on descriptive geometry. He resigned his post at the observatory at the end of that year.

In 1884, Stieltjes applied for a chair in Groningen. He was initially accepted, but in the end turned down by the Department of Education, since he lacked the required diplomas. In 1884, Hermite and professor David Bierens de Haan arranged for an honorary doctorate to be granted to Stieltjes by Leiden University, enabling him to become a professor. In 1885, he was appointed as member of the Royal Dutch Academy of Sciences (Koninklijke Nederlandse Akademie van Wetenschappen, KNAW), and the next year he became a foreign member. In 1889, he was appointed professor of differential and integral calculus at Toulouse University.

Stieltjes died on 31 December 1894 in Toulouse, France. He was buried in Terre-Cabade cemetery on 2 January 1895.

== Research ==
Stieltjes worked on almost all branches of analysis, continued fractions and number theory. For his work, he is sometimes referred to as "the father of the analytic theory of continued fractions".

His work is also seen as important as a first step towards the theory of Hilbert spaces. Other important contributions to mathematics that he made involved discontinuous functions and divergent series, differential equations, interpolation, the gamma function and elliptic functions. He became known internationally because of the Riemann–Stieltjes integral.

In 1886, Henri Poincaré and Stieltjes, simultaneously and independently, provided a definition of an asymptotic approximation and illustrated its use and practicality. Their papers were published in Acta Mathematica and Annales scientifiques de l'Ecole normale supérieure, respectively.

== Awards and honours ==
Stieltjes' work on continued fractions earned him the Ormoy prize of the Académie des Sciences in 1893. In 1884 the University of Leiden awarded him an honorary doctorate, and in 1885 he was elected to membership in the Royal Academy of Sciences of Amsterdam.

In honour of Stieltjes, since 1996, the Stieltjes Prize (Stieltjesprijs) has been awarded annually for the best PhD thesis in mathematics to a student of any Dutch university. All mathematics institutes and departments of Dutch universities are asked for an overview of the PhDs that have taken place in the academic year. The list thus obtained forms the list of candidates for the prize. The award consists of a certificate and an amount of 1200 Euros.

== See also ==
- Annales de la Faculté des Sciences de Toulouse co-founded by Stieltjes
- Chebyshev–Markov–Stieltjes inequalities
- Heine–Stieltjes polynomials
- Laplace–Stieltjes transform
- Lebesgue–Stieltjes integral
- Montel's theorem
- Riemann–Stieltjes integral
- Stieltjes constants
- Stieltjes matrix
- Stieltjes moment problem
- Stieltjes polynomials
- Stieltjes transformation (and Stieltjes inversion formula)
- Stieltjes–Wigert polynomials
