= Chebyshev's theorem =

Chebyshev's theorem is any of several theorems proven by Russian mathematician Pafnuty Chebyshev.

- Bertrand's postulate, that for every n there is a prime between n and 2n.
- Chebyshev's inequality, on the range of standard deviations around the mean, in statistics
- Chebyshev's sum inequality, about sums and products of decreasing sequences
- Chebyshev's equioscillation theorem, on the approximation of continuous functions with polynomials
- The statement that if the function $\pi(x)\ln x/x$ has a limit at infinity, then the limit is 1 (where π is the prime-counting function). This result has been superseded by the prime number theorem.
