= Bella A. Burnasheva =

Soviet Russian astronomer (born 1944)

Minor planets discovered: 13
2010 Chebyshev	13 October 1969
2232 Altaj	15 September 1969
2259 Sofievka	19 July 1971
2327 Gershberg	13 October 1969
2697 Albina	9 October 1969
3406 Omsk	21 February 1969
3921 Klementʹev	19 July 1971
4109 Anokhin	17 July 1969
4465 Rodita	14 October 1969
5075 Goryachev	13 October 1969
5218 Kutsak	9 October 1969
6278 Ametkhan	10 October 1971
7318 Dyukov	17 July 1969

Bella Alekseïevna Bournasheva (Бэлла Алексеевна Бурнашева, born 1944) is a Soviet–Russian astronomer credited with the discovery of several asteroids.

The minor planet 4427 Burnashev was named in honour of her and her husband Vladislav Ivanovich Burnashev.
