= Akiva Yaglom =

Russian physicist, mathematician, statistician, and meteorologist

Akiva Moiseevich Yaglom
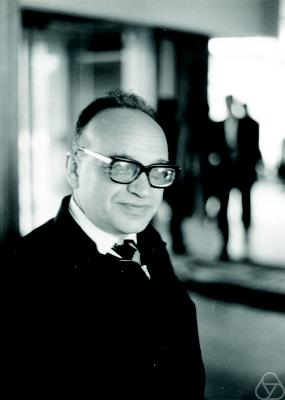
- Yaglom in 1976
- Born: 6 March 1921; Kharkiv, Ukrainian SSR
- Died: 13 December 2007 (aged 86); Boston, Massachusetts, United States
- Education: Lomonosov Moscow State University; Steklov Institute of Mathematics
- Awards: Otto Laporte Award (1988); Lewis Fry Richardson Medal
- Scientific career
- Fields: Probability theory, Turbulence
- Workplaces: Institute of Theoretical Geophysics; A.M. Obukhov Institute of Atmospheric Physics; Massachusetts Institute of Technology
- Doctoral advisor: Andrey Kolmogorov

Akiva Moiseevich Yaglom (Russian: Аки́ва Моисе́евич Ягло́м; 6 March 1921 – 13 December 2007) was a Soviet and Russian physicist, mathematician, statistician, and meteorologist. He was known for his contributions to the statistical theory of turbulence and theory of random processes. Yaglom spent most of his career in Russia working in various institutions, including the Institute of Theoretical Geophysics.

From 1992 until his death, Yaglom worked at the Massachusetts Institute of Technology as a research fellow in the Department of Aeronautics and Astronautics. He authored several popular books in mathematics and probability, some of them with his twin brother and mathematician Isaak Yaglom.

== Education and career ==
Akiva Yaglom was born on 6 March 1921 in Kharkiv, Ukraine to the family of an engineer. He had a twin brother Isaak. The family moved to Moscow when the Yaglom brothers were five years old. During their school years they were keen on mathematics. In 1938 they shared the first prize at the Moscow mathematical competition for schoolchildren. Yaglom joined Moscow State University in 1938, where he studied physics and mathematics. He completed his fourth year of diploma at the Sverdlovsk State University and received the masters in science degree in 1942. After a short period of work at the Main Geophysical Observatory, Yaglom joined the Steklov Institute of Mathematics of the USSR Academy of Sciences and completed his postgraduate studies in 1946 under the mentorship of Andrey Kolmogorov. His dissertation was "On the Statistical Reversibility of Brownian Motion".

After he received his Ph.D., Yaglom was offered a job at the Lebedev Physical Institute by the future Nobel laureates Igor Tamm and Vitaly Ginzburg, but he declined the offer because he knew that the job would have required him to deal with applied problems related to the development of nuclear weapons. He joined in the Institute of Atmospheric Physics of the USSR Academy of Sciences and worked at the Laboratory of Atmospheric Turbulence and worked there for more than 45 years. In 1955, he defended his second doctoral thesis "The Theory of Correlation between Continuous Processes and Fields with Applications to the Problems of Statistical Exploration of Time Series and to Turbulence Theory".

Yaglom was also a full professor in the Faculty of Probability Theory at the Mathematics and Mechanics Department of Moscow State University. In 1992, Yaglom went to the United States and joined the Massachusetts Institute of Technology. He died in Boston, Massachusetts on 13 December 2007.

== Principal works ==
Yaglom worked in many fields in applied mathematics and statistics, including the theory of random processes and the statistical theory of fluid mechanics. His initial studies on the theory of random functions were published in the lengthy 1952 article, "Introduction to the Theory of Random Functions", which appeared in the journal Uspekhi Fizicheskikh Nauk. Later, this work was published in the United States. His study on local structure of the acceleration field in a turbulent flow established the fact that the frequency spectrum of Lagrangian acceleration of a fluid particle in a turbulent flow is constant. This work was later independently repeated by Werner Heisenberg.

== Awards and honors ==
In 1955, Yaglom received a Doctor of Science degree, the highest scientific degree in the Soviet Union, for his work on theories of stochastic processes and their application to turbulence theory. He received the American Physical Society's Otto Laporte Award in 1988 for his "fundamental contribution to the statistical theory of turbulence and the study of its underlying mathematical structure."

Yaglom received the European Geosciences Union's 2008 Lewis Fry Richardson Medal, posthumously, for his "eminent and pioneering contributions to the development of statistical theories of turbulence, atmospheric dynamics and diffusion, including spectral techniques, stochastic and cascade models."

== Books authored ==
Yaglom authored six books and about 120 research papers. Most of his materials have been published in English and many other languages. The monograph titled Statistical Fluid Mechanics, co-authored with Andrei Monin, is regarded as an encyclopedic work in the subject field.

- A. M. Yaglom, An Introduction to the Theory of Stationary Random Functions, Dover Publications, 1962.
- A. M. Yaglom and I. M. Yaglom, Challenging Mathematical Problems With Elementary Solutions, Volume 1, Dover Publications, 1987.
- A. M. Yaglom and I. M. Yaglom, Challenging Mathematical Problems With Elementary Solutions, Volume 2, Dover Publications, 1987.
- A. S. Monin and A. M. Yaglom, Statistical Fluid Mechanics: Mechanics of Turbulence, Dover Publications, 2007.
