= Benjamin Kagan =

Russian geometer (1869–1953)

Veniamin Kagan
- Born: Veniamin Fyodorovich Kagan; 9 March 1869; Shavli, Kovno Governorate, Russian Empire
- Died: 8 May 1953 (aged 84); Moscow, Russian Soviet Federative Socialist Republic, Soviet Union
- Education: Imperial Novorossiya University
- Scientific career
- Fields: Mathematics
- Workplaces: Imperial Moscow University
- Doctoral advisor: Andrey Markov; Konstantin Posse
- Doctoral students: Viktor Wagner; Isaak Yaglom

Veniamin Fyodorovich Kagan (Russian: Вениами́н Фёдорович Ка́ган; 9 March 1869 – 8 May 1953) was a Russian and Soviet mathematician and expert in non-Euclidean geometry. He is the maternal grandfather of mathematicians Yakov Sinai and Grigory Barenblatt.

== Biography ==
Kagan was born in Shavli, in the Kovno Governorate of the Russian Empire (now Šiauliai, Lithuania) in 1869, to a poor Lithuanian Jewish family. In 1871, his family moved to Yekaterinoslav (now Dnipro), where he grew up. Kagan entered the Imperial Novorossiya University in Odessa in 1887, but was expelled for revolutionary activities in 1889. He was put on probation and sent back to Yekaterinoslav. He studied mathematics on his own and, in 1892, passed the state exam at Kiev University.

In 1894, Kagan moved to Saint Petersburg, where he continued his studies with Andrey Markov and Konstantin Posse. They tried to help him to obtain an academic position, but Kagan's Jewish background was an obstacle. Only in 1897 was he allowed to become a dozent at the Imperial Novorossiya University, where he continued to work until 1923. His students in the theory of relativity class he taught in 1921-22 included Nikolai Papaleksi, Alexander Frumkin, and Igor Tamm.

Kagan worked at the Imperial Moscow University, where he held the Geometry Chair from 1923 to 1952.

In 1924, he joined Otto Schmidt in drawing up plans for the Great Soviet Encyclopedia.

== Mathematical work ==
He published over 100 mathematical papers in different parts of geometry, particularly on hyperbolic geometry and on Riemannian geometry. He received the Stalin Prize in 1943. He founded the science publisher Mathesis in Odesa. He was a director of the mathematics and natural sciences department of the Great Soviet Encyclopedia. He wrote a definitive biography of Nikolai Lobachevsky and edited his collected works (5 volumes, 1946–1951).

Kagan's doctoral students include Viktor Wagner and Isaak Yaglom.

== Trivia ==
- He's a minor character in The Fourth Prose (1930) by Osip Mandelstam.
