= Yurii Sokolov =

Soviet mathematician (1896–1971)

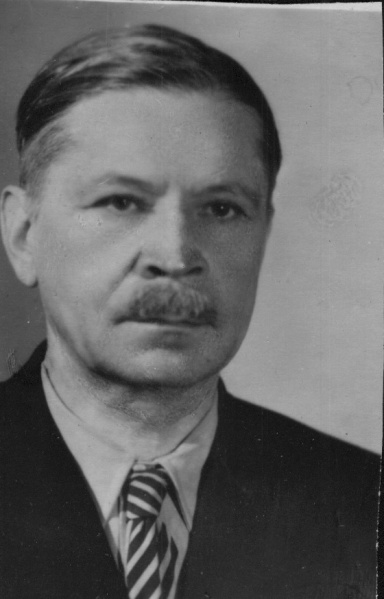

Yurii Dmitrievich Sokolov (Russian: Ю́рий Дми́триевич Соколо́в; Yuriy Dmytrovych Sokolov, Ukrainian: Юрій Дмитрович Соколов; May 26, 1896 – February 2, 1971) was a Soviet and Ukrainian mathematician.

== Biography ==
Sokolov was born on May 26, 1896, in Labinskaya Stanitsa (now Labinsk), Russia. He studied at Kiev Institute of Peoples Education and graduated in 1921. He taught at the Applied Mathematics Division of the Academy. He completed his PhD from Kiev University. His doctorate advisor was Dmitry Grave. His doctorate thesis was in the area of mechanics of particles.

After completing his PhD, Sokolov taught at the Institute of Mathematics at the National Academy of Sciences of Ukraine. He also taught at many other institutions in Kiev.

Sokolov died on February 2, 1971, in Kiev, Ukraine, Soviet Union.

== Research ==
Sokolov did research on the n-body problem for nearly 50 years. He summarized his work in the 1951 book Singular trajectories of a system of free material points (Russian). He did research on functional equations and on such practical problems as the filtration of groundwater. He also did research on celestial mechanics and hydromechanics.

Sokolov is also known for 'the averaging method with functional corrections' or 'the Sokolov method'. This method is for finding approximate solutions to differential and integral equations.

Sokolov wrote the book The method of averaging of functional corrections (1967), in which he summaries his many important work. He wrote the book at an elementary level. The first part of the book discusses applications of his method to problems which can be modelled by linear integral equations with constant limits. A number of different sufficient conditions for the approximations to converge and presents error estimates were given. The next three parts of the book first examines the problems which can be modelled by nonlinear integral equations with constant limits and then extend the analysis to the situation where the upper limit is variable. In the final part of the book, Sokolov's methods to integral equations of mixed type are examined. He also presented some generalizations of the method in a number of appendices.

== Righteous Among the Nations ==
For the rescue of Jewish mathematician Semyon Zukhovitskii during the German occupation of Kiev, Yurii Sokolov and his wife Mariya were entered in the list of Righteous Among the Nations.
