= Stefan E. Warschawski =

Stefan Warschawski
- Born: 18 April 1904; Lida, Russian Empire
- Died: 5 May 1989 (aged 85)
- Education: University of Göttingen; University of Königsberg
- Scientific career
- Workplaces: University of California, San Diego; Washington University in St. Louis; Brown University; University of Minnesota
- Doctoral advisor: Alexander Ostrowski
- Doctoral students: Vernor Vinge

Stefan Emanuel "Steve" Warschawski (April 18, 1904 – May 5, 1989) was a Russian-born American mathematician, a professor and department chair at the University of Minnesota and the founder of the mathematics department at the University of California, San Diego.

== Early life and education ==
Warschawski was born in Lida, now in Belarus; at the time of his birth Lida was part of the Russian Empire. His father was a Russian medical doctor, and his mother was ethnically German; the family spoke German at home. In 1915, his family moved to Königsberg, in Prussia (now Kaliningrad, Russia), the home of his mother's family.

Warschawski studied at the University of Königsberg until 1926 and then moved to the University of Göttingen for his doctoral studies under the supervision of Alexander Ostrowski. Ostrowski moved to the University of Basel and Warschawski followed him there to complete his studies.

== Career ==
After receiving his Ph.D., Warschawski took a position at Göttingen in 1930 but, due to the rise of Hitler and his own Jewish ancestry, he soon moved to Utrecht University in Utrecht, Netherlands and then Columbia University in New York City.

After a sequence of temporary positions, he found a permanent faculty position at Washington University in St. Louis in 1939. During World War II he moved to Brown University and then the University of Minnesota, where he remained until his 1963 move to San Diego, where he was the founding chair of the mathematics department. Warschawski stepped down as chair in 1967, and retired in 1971, but remained active in research: approximately one third of his research publications were written after his retirement. Over the course of his career, he advised 19 Ph.D. students, all but one at either Minnesota or San Diego. Vernor Vinge is among Warschawski's doctoral students.

== Research ==
Warschawski was known for his research on complex analysis and in particular on conformal maps. He also made contributions to the theory of minimal surfaces and harmonic functions.

The Noshiro–Warschawski theorem is named after Warschawski and Noshiro, who discovered it independently; it states that, if f is an analytic function on the open unit disk such that the real part of its first derivative is positive, then f is one-to-one.

In 1980, he solved the Visser–Ostrowski problem for derivatives of conformal mappings at the boundary.

== Legacy ==
Warschawski was honored in 1978 by the creation of the Stefan E. Warschawski Assistant Professorship at San Diego. The Stephen E. Warschawski Memorial Scholarship was also given in his name in 1999–2000 to four UCSD undergraduates as a one-time award. His wife, Ilse, died in 2009 and left a US$1 million bequest to UCSD, part of which went towards endowing a professorship in the mathematics department.
