= Nikolai Chebotaryov =

Soviet mathematician (1894–1947)

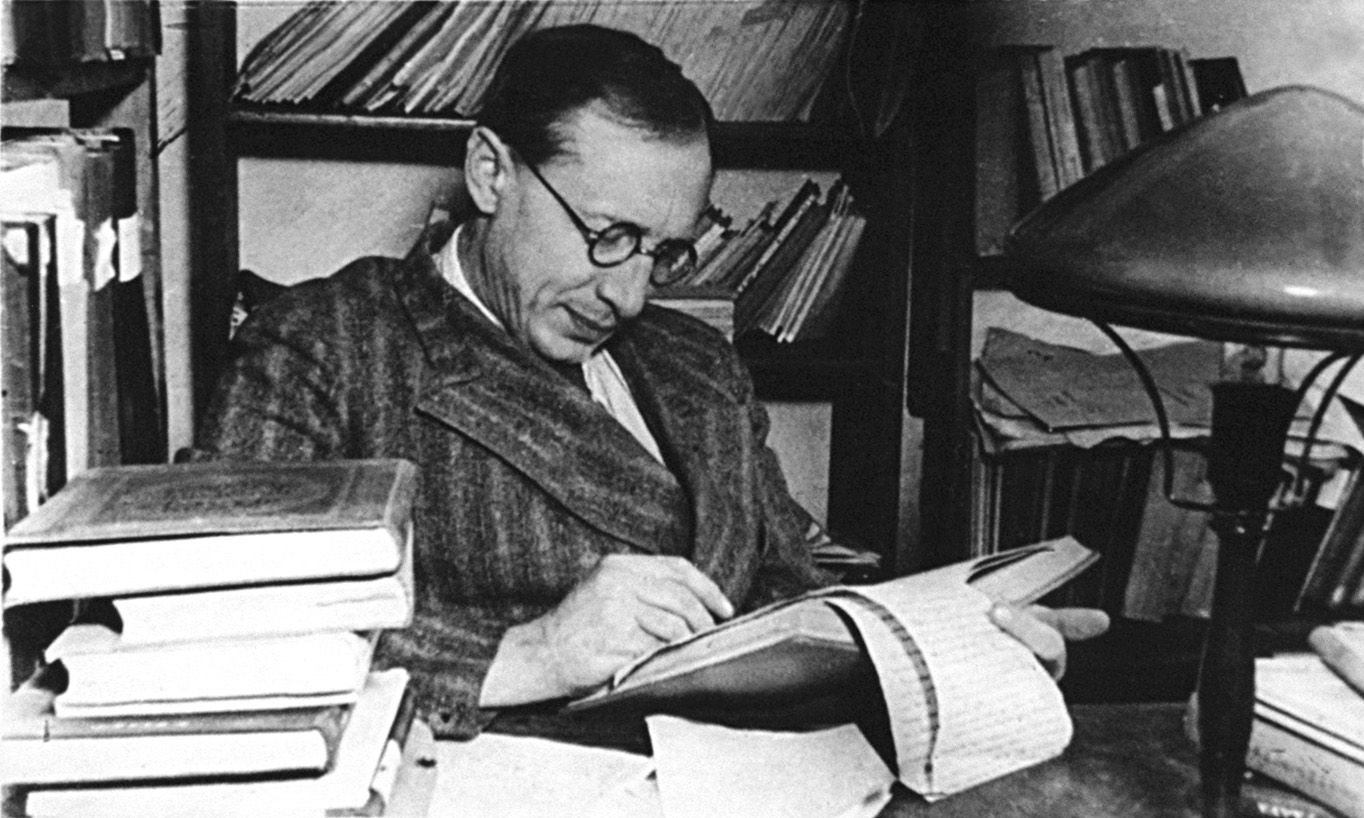
- Born: 15 June 1894; Kamianets-Podilskyi, Russian Empire
- Died: 2 July 1947 (aged 53); Moscow, Russian SFSR, Soviet Union
- Education: Kiev University
- Known for: Chebotarev's density theorem
- Scientific career
- Fields: Mathematics
- Workplaces: Kazan State University
- Doctoral advisor: Dmitry Grave
- Doctoral students: Mark Krein; Naum Meiman

Nikolai Grigorievich Chebotaryov (often spelled Chebotarov or Chebotarev; Russian: Никола́й Григо́рьевич Чеботарёв; Ukrainian: Мико́ла Григо́рович Чеботарьо́в; 15 June [O.S. 3 June] 1894 – 2 July 1947) was a Soviet mathematician. He is best known for the Chebotaryov density theorem.

He was a student of Dmitry Grave. Chebotaryov worked on the algebra of polynomials, in particular examining the distribution of the zeros. He also studied Galois theory and wrote a textbook on the subject titled Basic Galois Theory. His ideas were used by Emil Artin to prove the Artin reciprocity law. He worked with his student Anatoly Dorodnov on a generalization of the quadrature of the lune, and proved the conjecture now known as the Chebotarev theorem on roots of unity.

== Early life ==
Nikolai Chebotaryov was born on 15 June 1894 in Kamianets-Podilskyi, Russian Empire (now in Ukraine). He entered the department of physics and mathematics at Kiev University in 1912. In 1928, he became a professor at Kazan University, remaining there for the rest of his life. He died on 2 July 1947. He was an atheist. On 14 May 2010, a memorial plaque for Nikolai Chebotaryov was unveiled on the main administration building of I.I. Mechnikov Odessa National University.
