= Markov brothers' inequality =

Inequality about polynomials

In mathematics, the Markov brothers' inequality is an inequality, proved in the 1890s by brothers Andrey Markov and Vladimir Markov, two Russian mathematicians. This inequality bounds the maximum of the derivatives of a polynomial on an interval in terms of the maximum of the polynomial. For k = 1 it was proved by Andrey Markov, and for k = 2, 3, ... by his brother Vladimir Markov.

== The statement ==
Let P be a polynomial of degree ≤ n. Then for all nonnegative integers $k$

$$\max_{-1 \leq x \leq 1} \big|P^{(k)}(x)\big| \leq \frac{n^2 (n^2 - 1^2) (n^2 - 2^2) \cdots (n^2 - (k - 1)^2)}{1 \cdot 3 \cdot 5 \cdots (2k - 1)} \max_{-1 \leq x \leq 1} |P(x)|.$$

This inequality is tight, as equality is attained for Chebyshev polynomials of the first kind.

== Related inequalities ==
- Bernstein's inequality (mathematical analysis)
- Remez inequality

== Applications ==
Markov's inequality is used to obtain lower bounds in computational complexity theory via the so-called "polynomial method".
