= Chebyshev–Markov–Stieltjes inequalities =

Mathematical theorem

In mathematical analysis, the Chebyshev–Markov–Stieltjes inequalities are inequalities related to the problem of moments that were formulated in the 1880s by Pafnuty Chebyshev and proved independently by Andrey Markov and (somewhat later) by Thomas Jan Stieltjes. Informally, they provide sharp bounds on a measure from above and from below in terms of its first moments.

== Formulation ==
Given m_{0},...,m_{2m-1} ∈ R, consider the collection C of measures μ on R such that

$$\int x^k d\mu(x) = m_k$$

for k = 0,1,...,2m − 1 (and in particular the integral is defined and finite).

Let P_{0},P_{1}, ...,P_{m} be the first m + 1 orthogonal polynomials with respect to μ ∈ C, and let ξ_{1},...ξ_{m} be the zeros of P_{m}. It is not hard to see that the polynomials P_{0},P_{1}, ...,P_{m-1} and the numbers ξ_{1},...ξ_{m} are the same for every μ ∈ C, and therefore are determined uniquely by m_{0},...,m_{2m-1}.

Denote

$$\rho_{m-1}(z) = 1 \Big/ \sum_{k=0}^{m-1} |P_k(z)|^2$$.

Theorem For j = 1,2,...,m, and any μ ∈ C,

$$\mu(-\infty, \xi_j] \leq \rho_{m-1}(\xi_1) + \cdots + \rho_{m-1}(\xi_j) \leq \mu(-\infty,\xi_{j+1}).$$
