= Vladimir Markov (mathematician) =

Russian mathematician

Vladimir Andreyevich Markov
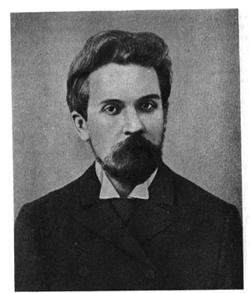
- Born: 8 May 1871
- Died: 18 January 1897 (aged 25)
- Scientific career
- Fields: Mathematics
- Doctoral advisor: Pafnuty Chebyshev

Vladimir Andreyevich Markov (Russian: Влади́мир Андре́евич Ма́рков; May 8, 1871 – January 18, 1897) was a Russian mathematician, known for proving the Markov brothers' inequality with his older brother Andrey Markov. He died of tuberculosis at the age of 25.
