= 2697 Albina =

Large main-belt asteroid

Discovery
- Discovered by: B. Burnasheva
- Discovery site: Crimean Astrophysical Obs.
- Discovery date: 9 October 1969

Designations
- Named after: Albina Serova (astronomer)
- Alternative designations: 1969 TC_{3} · 1929 TB; 1936 TL · 1938 BE; 1939 DE · 1942 RV; 1949 SC_{1} · 1950 YA; 1952 DU_{1} · 1968 OT; 1972 BJ · 1975 QR; 1975 RG · 1979 FK_{2} 1983 VR_{1}
- Minor planet category: main-belt · (outer)

Orbital characteristics
- Epoch 4 September 2017 (JD 2458000.5)
- Uncertainty parameter 0
- Observation arc: 87.30 yr (31,887 days)
- Aphelion: 3.8438 AU
- Perihelion: 3.2798 AU
- Semi-major axis: 3.5618 AU
- Eccentricity: 0.0792
- Orbital period (sidereal): 6.72 yr (2,455 days)
- Mean anomaly: 14.298°
- Mean motion: 0° 8^{m} 47.76^{s} / day
- Inclination: 3.5811°
- Longitude of ascending node: 270.95°
- Argument of perihelion: 132.11°

Physical characteristics
- Dimensions: 51.36 km (derived); 51.54±1.4 km (IRAS:16); 52.74±0.93 km
- Synodic rotation period: 9.6 h 16.5871±0.0165 h
- Geometric albedo: 0.0385 (derived); 0.053±0.002; 0.0553±0.003 (IRAS:16)
- Spectral type: X · C
- Absolute magnitude (H): 10.6 · 10.2 · 10.96±0.25 · 10.367±0.002 (R)

2697 Albina, provisional designation 1969 TC_{3}, is a carbonaceous asteroid from the outer region of the asteroid belt, approximately 52 kilometers in diameter. It was discovered on 9 October 1969, by Russian astronomer Bella Burnasheva at the Crimean Astrophysical Observatory, Nauchnyj, on the Crimean peninsula. The asteroid was later named after Russian astronomer Albina Serova.

== Orbit and classification ==
Albina orbits the Sun in the outer main-belt at a distance of 3.3–3.8 AU once every 6 years and 9 months (2,455 days). Its orbit has an eccentricity of 0.08 and an inclination of 4° with respect to the ecliptic.

The asteroid was first identified as 1929 TB at Lowell Observatory in 1929. It first used observation was taken at Uccle Observatory in 1936, extending the body's observation arc by 33 years prior to its official discovery at Nauchnyj.

== Physical characteristics ==
Albina has been characterized as an X-type asteroid by Pan-STARRS' photometric survey. It has also been dark described as a carbonaceous C-type asteroid in the Lightcurve Data Base.

=== Rotation period ===
A rotational lightcurve of Albina was obtained from photometric observations made at the U.S. Palomar Transient Factory in October 2010. The lightcurve gave a rotation period of 16.5871±0.0165 hours with a brightness amplitude of 0.16 in magnitude (U=2), and supersedes a previous period of 9.6 hours from a fragmentary lightcurve, obtained by French astronomer Laurent Bernasconi in March 2006 (U=1).

=== Diameter and albedo ===
According to the space-based surveys carried out by the Infrared Astronomical Satellite (IRAS) and the Japanese Akari satellite, Albina has an albedo of 0.055 and 0.053, with a corresponding diameter of 51.5 and 52.7 kilometers, respectively. The Collaborative Asteroid Lightcurve Link derives a lower albedo of 0.039 and a diameter of 51.4 kilometers.

== Naming ==
This minor planet was named after Russian astronomer from Moscow, Albina Serova, who is a friend of the discoverer. The official naming citation was published by the Minor Planet Center on 18 September 1986 (M.P.C. 11156).
