= Chebyshev integral =

In mathematics, the Chebyshev integral, named after Pafnuty Chebyshev, is

$$\int x^p (1-x)^q \, dx = B (x; 1+p, 1+q),$$

where $B (x; a, b)$ is an incomplete beta function.
