= 3406 Omsk =

Main-belt asteroid

Discovery
- Discovered by: B. Burnasheva
- Discovery site: Crimean Astrophysical Obs.
- Discovery date: 21 February 1969

Designations
- Named after: Omsk (Russian city)
- Alternative designations: 1969 DA · 1951 KA_{1} 1983 CH_{3}
- Minor planet category: main-belt · (middle) background

Orbital characteristics
- Epoch 23 March 2018 (JD 2458200.5)
- Uncertainty parameter 0
- Observation arc: 48.69 yr (17,783 d)
- Aphelion: 3.1645 AU
- Perihelion: 2.4279 AU
- Semi-major axis: 2.7962 AU
- Eccentricity: 0.1317
- Orbital period (sidereal): 4.68 yr (1,708 d)
- Mean anomaly: 124.44°
- Mean motion: 0° 12^{m} 38.88^{s} / day
- Inclination: 8.3583°
- Longitude of ascending node: 269.84°
- Argument of perihelion: 310.19°

Physical characteristics
- Mean diameter: 13.43±0.58 km 14.42 km (derived); 14.68±1.3 km 16.058±0.217 km 16.59±0.48 km
- Synodic rotation period: 7.275±0.006 h
- Geometric albedo: 0.1569±0.0358; 0.1619 (derived); 0.201±0.013; 0.224±0.023; 0.2476±0.050
- Spectral type: SMASS = X M · C
- Absolute magnitude (H): 11.30; 11.60; 11.8; 12.25±0.42

3406 Omsk, provisional designation 1969 DA, is a background asteroid from the central regions of the asteroid belt, approximately 15 kilometers (9.3 miles) in diameter. It was discovered on 21 February 1969, by Soviet astronomer Bella Burnasheva at the Crimean Astrophysical Observatory on the Crimean peninsula in Nauchnij. The possibly metallic M/X-type asteroid has a rotation period of 7.3 hours. It was named for the Russian city of Omsk.

== Orbit and classification ==
Omsk is a non-family asteroid from the main belt's background population. It orbits the Sun in the central asteroid belt at a distance of 2.4–3.2 AU once every 4 years and 8 months (1,708 days; semi-major axis of 2.8 AU). Its orbit has an eccentricity of 0.13 and an inclination of 8° with respect to the ecliptic.

The asteroid was first observed as 1951 KA_{1} at McDonald Observatory in May 1951. The body's observation arc begins with its official discovery observation at Nauchnij in February 1969.

== Physical characteristics ==
In the SMASS classification, Omsk is an X-type asteroid. It has also been characterized as a metallic M-type and carbonaceous C-type by the Wide-field Infrared Survey Explorer (WISE) and Pan-STARRS, respectively.

=== Rotation period ===
In May 2007, a rotational lightcurve of Omsk was obtained from photometric observations at the Mount Tarana Observatory (431) in Bathurst, Australia. Lightcurve analysis gave a well-defined rotation period of 7.275 hours with a brightness amplitude of 0.28 magnitude (U=3).

=== Diameter and albedo ===
According to the surveys carried out by the Infrared Astronomical Satellite IRAS, the Japanese Akari satellite and the NEOWISE mission of NASA's WISE telescope, Omsk measures between 13.43 and 16.59 kilometers in diameter and its surface has an albedo between 0.1569 and 0.2476.

The Collaborative Asteroid Lightcurve Link derives an albedo of 0.1619 and a diameter of 14.42 kilometers based on an absolute magnitude of 11.8.

== Naming ==
This minor planet was named after the Siberian city of Omsk, the discoverer's birthplace and the administrative center of Omsk Oblast, Russia. The official naming citation was published by the Minor Planet Center on 18 February 1992 (M.P.C. 19693).
