= Nikolai Yefimov =

Russian mathematician (1910–1982)

Nikolai Vladimirovich Yefimov (Russian: Никола́й Влади́мирович Ефи́мов; 31 May 1910 in Orenburg – 14 August 1982 in Moscow) was a Soviet mathematician. He is most famous for his work on generalized Hilbert's problem on surfaces of negative curvature.

Yefimov grew up in Rostov-on-Don and graduated from Rostov State University, where he studied with Morduhai-Boltovskoi. He worked at Voronezh State University from 1934 to 1941. He taught at the Moscow State University since 1946. Aleksei Pogorelov was one of his students there.

He received the Lobachevsky Prize in 1951 and Lenin Prize in 1966. He was an invited plenary speaker at the International Congress of Mathematicians in Moscow, 1966. He became a corresponding member of the Academy of Sciences of the Soviet Union in 1979.
