= Isaak Yaglom =

Soviet mathematician (1921–1988)

- Born: 6 March 1921; Kharkov, Ukrainian SSR
- Died: 17 April 1988 (aged 67); Moscow, Russian SFSR, Soviet Union
- Education: Moscow State University
- Scientific career
- Fields: Mathematics
- Workplaces: Yaroslavl State University
- Doctoral advisor: Boris Delaunay; Veniamin Kagan

Isaak Moiseevich Yaglom (Russian: Исаа́к Моисе́евич Ягло́м; 6 March 1921 – 17 April 1988) was a Soviet mathematician and author of popular mathematics books, some with his twin Akiva Yaglom.

Yaglom received a Ph.D. from Moscow State University in 1945 as student of Veniamin Kagan. As the author of several books, translated into English, that have become academic standards of reference, he has an international stature. His attention to the necessities of learning (pedagogy) make his books pleasing experiences for students. The seven authors of his Russian obituary recount "…the breadth of his interests was truly extraordinary: he was seriously interested in history and philosophy, passionately loved and had a good knowledge of literature and art, often came forward with reports and lectures on the most diverse topics (for example, on Alexander Blok, Anna Akhmatova, and the Dutch painter M. C. Escher), actively took part in the work of the cinema club in Yaroslavl and the music club at the House of Composers in Moscow, and was a continual participant of conferences on mathematical linguistics and on semiotics."

== University life ==
Yaglom started his higher education at Moscow State University in 1938. During World War II he volunteered, but due to myopia he was deferred from military service. In the evacuation of Moscow he went with his family to Sverdlovsk in the Ural Mountains. He studied at Sverdlovsk State University, graduated in 1942, and when the usual Moscow faculty assembled in Sverdlovsk during the war, he took up graduate study. Under the geometer Veniamin Kagan he developed his Ph.D. thesis which he defended in Moscow in 1945. It is reported that this thesis "was devoted to projective metrics on a plane and their connections with different types of complex numbers $a + jb$ (where $jj=-1$, or $jj=+1$, or else $jj=0$)."

== Institutes and titles ==
During his career, Yaglom was affiliated with these institutions:

- Moscow Energy Institute (1946) – lecturer in mathematics
- Moscow State University (1946–1949) – lecturer, department of analysis and differential geometry
- Orekhovo-Zuevo Pedagogical Institute (1949–1956) – lecturer in mathematics
- Lenin State Pedagogical Institute (Moscow) (1956–1968) – obtained D.Sc. 1965
- Moscow Evening Metallurgical Institute (1968–1974) – professor of mathematics
- Yaroslavl State University (1974–1983) – professor of mathematics
- Academy of Pedagogical Sciences (1984–1988) – technical consultant

== Affine geometry ==
In 1962 Yaglom and Vladimir G. Ashkinuse published Ideas and Methods of Affine and Projective Geometry, in Russian. The text is limited to affine geometry since projective geometry was put off to a second volume that did not appear. The concept of hyperbolic angle is developed through area of hyperbolic sectors. A treatment of Routh's theorem is given at page 193. This textbook, published by the Ministry of Education, includes 234 exercises with hints and solutions in an appendix.

== English translations ==
Isaac Yaglom wrote over 40 books and many articles. Several were translated, and appeared in the year given:

=== Complex numbers in geometry (1968) ===
Translated by Eric J. F. Primrose, published by Academic Press (N.Y.). The trinity of complex number planes is laid out and exploited. Topics include line coordinates in the Euclidean and Lobachevski planes, and inversive geometry.

=== Geometric Transformations (1962, 1968, 1973, 2009) ===
The first three books were originally published in English by Random House as part of the series New Mathematical Library (Volumes 8, 21, and 24). They were keenly appreciated by proponents of the New Math in the U.S.A., but represented only a part of Yaglom's two-volume original published in Russian in 1955 and 56. More recently the final portion of Yaglom's work was translated into English and published by the Mathematical Association of America. All four volumes are now available from the MAA in the series Anneli Lax New Mathematical Library (Volumes 8, 21, 24, and 44).

=== A simple non-euclidean geometry and its physical basis (1979) ===
Subtitle: An elementary account of Galilean geometry and the Galilean principle of relativity. Translated by Abe Shenitzer, published by Springer-Verlag. In his prefix, the translator says the book is "a fascinating story which flows from one geometry to another, from geometry to algebra, and from geometry to kinematics, and in so doing crosses artificial boundaries separating one area of mathematics from another and mathematics from physics." The author's own prefix speaks of "the important connection between Klein's Erlanger Program and the principles of relativity."

The approach taken is elementary; simple manipulations by shear mapping lead on page 68 to the conclusion that "the difference between the Galilean geometry of points and the Galilean geometry of lines is just a matter of terminology".

The concepts of the dual number and its "imaginary" ε, ε^{2} = 0, do not appear in the development of Galilean geometry. However, Yaglom shows that the common slope concept in analytic geometry corresponds to the Galilean angle. Yaglom extensively develops his non-Euclidean geometry including the theory of cycles (pp. 77–79), duality, and the circumcycle and incycle of a triangle (p. 104).

Yaglom continues with his Galilean study to the inversive Galilean plane by including a special line at infinity and showing the topology with a stereographic projection. The Conclusion of the book delves into the Minkowskian geometry of hyperbolas in the plane, including the nine-point hyperbola. Yaglom also covers the inversive Minkowski plane.

=== Probability and information (1983) ===
Co-author: A. M. Yaglom. Russian editions in 1956, 59 and 72. Translated by V. K. Jain, published by D. Reidel and the Hindustan Publishing Corporation, India. The channel capacity work of Claude Shannon is developed from first principles in four chapters: probability, entropy and information, information calculation to solve logical problems, and applications to information transmission. The final chapter is well-developed including code efficiency, Huffman codes, natural language and biological information channels, influence of noise, and error detection and correction.

=== Challenging Mathematical Problems With Elementary Solutions (1987) ===
Co-author: A. M. Yaglom. Two volumes. Russian edition in 1954. First English edition 1964–1967

=== Felix Klein and Sophus Lie (1988) ===
Translated from the Russian by Sergei Sossinsky. Subtitle: "The evolution of the idea of symmetry in the 19th century". In his chapter on "Felix Klein and his Erlangen Program", Yaglom says that "finding a general description of all geometric systems [was] considered by mathematicians the central question of the day." A great number of mathematicians are credited in this account of the modern tools and methods of symmetry.

In 2009 the book was republished by Ishi Press as Geometries, Groups and Algebras in the Nineteenth Century.

== See also ==
- Anti-cosmopolitan campaign
