= 2010 Chebyshev =

Main-belt asteroid

Discovery
- Discovered by: B. A. Burnasheva
- Discovery site: Crimean Astrophysical Obs.
- Discovery date: 13 October 1969

Designations
- Named after: Pafnuty Chebyshev (Russian mathematician)
- Alternative designations: 1969 TL_{4} · 1931 VA; 1948 YA · 1958 TF_{1}
- Minor planet category: main-belt · (outer)

Orbital characteristics
- Epoch 4 September 2017 (JD 2458000.5)
- Uncertainty parameter 0
- Observation arc: 85.41 yr (31,195 days)
- Aphelion: 3.6737 AU
- Perihelion: 2.5039 AU
- Semi-major axis: 3.0888 AU
- Eccentricity: 0.1894
- Orbital period (sidereal): 5.43 yr (1,983 days)
- Mean anomaly: 271.09°
- Mean motion: 0° 10^{m} 53.76^{s} / day
- Inclination: 2.3971°
- Longitude of ascending node: 8.5512°
- Argument of perihelion: 33.208°

Physical characteristics
- Dimensions: 24.649±0.194
- Geometric albedo: 0.065±0.012
- Spectral type: Tholen = BU: B–V = 0.705; U–B = 0.339
- Absolute magnitude (H): 11.62

2010 Chebyshev, provisional designation 1969 TL_{4}, is a rare-type carbonaceous asteroid from the outer regions of the asteroid belt, approximately 25 kilometers in diameter. The asteroid was discovered on 13 October 1969, by Soviet astronomer Bella Burnasheva at the Crimean Astrophysical Observatory in Nauchnyj, on the Crimean peninsula. It was named for mathematician Pafnuty Chebyshev.

== Classification and orbit ==
Chebyshev orbits the Sun in the outer main-belt at a distance of 2.5–3.7 AU once every 5 years and 5 months (1,983 days). Its orbit has an eccentricity of 0.19 and an inclination of 2° with respect to the ecliptic. The asteroid was first identified as 1931 VA at Lowell Observatory in October 1931, extending the body's observation arc by 38 years prior to its official discovery observation at Nauchnyj.

== Physical characteristics ==
=== Spectral type ===
In the Tholen classification, Chebyshev is a rare BU: type, a variation of the carbonaceous B-type asteroids.

=== Diameter and albedo ===
According to the survey carried out by the NEOWISE mission of NASA's space-based Wide-field Infrared Survey Explorer, Chebyshev measures 24.649 kilometers in diameter and its surface has an albedo of 0.065. Chebyshev has an absolute magnitude of 11.62.

== Lightcurve ==
As of 2017, Chebyshev' rotation period and shape remain unknown.

== Naming ==
This minor planet was named after Russian mathematician and mechanician Pafnuty Chebyshev (1821–1894). The official naming citation was published by the Minor Planet Center on 1 September 1978 (M.P.C. 4481). The lunar crater Chebyshev was also named in his honor.
