= Alexander Ostrowski =

Russian mathematician

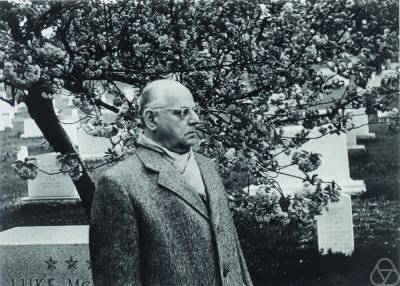
- Born: 25 September 1893; Kiev, Kiev Governorate, Russian Empire
- Died: 20 November 1986 (aged 93); Montagnola, Lugano, Switzerland
- Scientific career
- Thesis: Ueber Dirichletsche Reihen und algebraische Differentialgleichungen (1920)
- Doctoral advisor: Edmund Landau; Felix Klein
- Other academic advisors: Dmitry Grave; Kurt Hensel
- Doctoral students: Theodore Motzkin; Walter Gautschi; Stefan E. Warschawski

Alexander Markowich Ostrowski (Ukrainian: Олександр Маркович Островський; Russian: Алекса́ндр Ма́ркович Остро́вский; 25 September 1893 – 20 November 1986) was a mathematician.

== Biography ==
His father Mark having been a merchant, Alexander Ostrowski attended the Kiev College of Commerce, not a high school, and thus had an insufficient qualification to be admitted to university. However, his talent did not remain undetected: Ostrowski's mentor, Dmitry Grave, wrote to Edmund Landau and Kurt Hensel for help.

Subsequently, Ostrowski began to study mathematics at Marburg University under Hensel's supervision in 1912. During World War I he was interned, but thanks to the intervention of Hensel, the restrictions on his movements were eased somewhat, and he was allowed to use the university library.

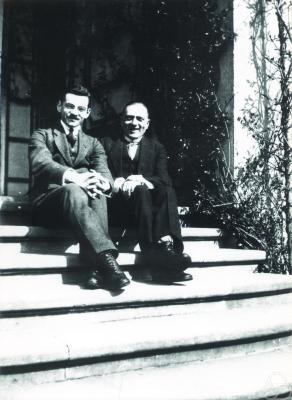
Ostrowski (right) with Otto Toeplitz

After the war ended, Ostrowski moved to Göttingen where he wrote his doctoral dissertation and was influenced by David Hilbert, Felix Klein, and Landau. In 1920, after having obtained his doctorate from the University of Göttingen, Ostrowski moved to Hamburg where he worked as Erich Hecke's assistant and finished his habilitation in 1922. In 1923, he returned to Göttingen and, in 1928, became Professor of Mathematics at the University of Basel, until retirement in 1958. In 1950, Ostrowski obtained Swiss citizenship. After retirement, he still published scientific papers until his late eighties.

His work was mainly, but not exclusively, in algebra and number theory, and he had a great interest in numerical methods as well as abstract mathematics.

== Selected publications ==
- Vorlesungen über Differential- und Integralrechnung, 3 vols., Birkhäuser; vol. 1, 1945; vol. 1, 2nd edition, 1960; vol. 2, 1951; vol. 3, 1954;
- Solution of equations and systems of equations. Academic Press, New York 1960; 2nd edition 1965; 2016 pbk reprint of 2nd edition
- Aufgabensammlung zur Infinitesimalrechnung. several vols., Birkhäuser, Basel (1st edition 1964; 2nd edition 1972) pbk reprint vol. 1; vol. 2 A; vol. 2 B; vol. 3
- Collected mathematical papers. 6 vols., Birkhäuser, Basel 1983–1984. vol. 1; vol. 2; vol. 3; vol. 4; vol. 5; vol. 6

== See also ==
- Ostrowski's theorem
- Ostrowski's overconvergence theorem
- Ostrowski numeration
- Ostrowski Prize
