= Konstantin Posse =

Russian mathematician (1847–1928)

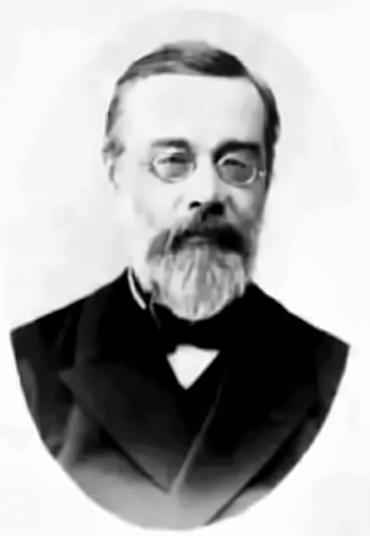
- Born: September 29, 1847; Novgorod Governorate, Russia
- Died: August 24, 1928 (aged 80); Leningrad, Soviet Union
- Education: St. Petersburg University
- Scientific career
- Fields: Mathematics
- Workplaces: Odessa University
- Doctoral advisor: Pafnuty Chebyshev
- Doctoral students: Veniamin Kagan; D. D. Morduhai-Boltovskoi

Konstantin Aleksandrovich Posse (Russian: Константин Александрович Поссе; September 29, 1847 – August 24, 1928) was a Russian mathematician known for contributions to analysis and in particular approximation theory. Veniamin Kagan and D. D. Morduhai-Boltovskoi were among his students.

== Selected publications ==
- Possé, C. (1885). "Quelques remarques sur une certaine question de minimum". Mathematische Annalen. 26 (4): 593–596. doi:10.1007/BF01444256. ISSN 0025-5831. JFM 18.0325.01. S2CID 122505974.
- Possé, C. (1886). Sur quelques applications des fractions continues algébriques. JFM 18.0161.02.

== Sources ==
- "Поссе, Константин Александрович" . Brockhaus and Efron Encyclopedic Dictionary (in Russian). 1906.
