= Chebyshev's bias =

Number theory related to prime numbers

Plot of the function $\pi(x;4,3)-\pi(x;4,1)$ for n ≤ 30000

In number theory, Chebyshev's bias is the phenomenon that most of the time, there are more primes of the form 4k + 3 than of the form 4k + 1, up to the same limit. This phenomenon was first observed by Russian mathematician Pafnuty Chebyshev in 1853.

== Description ==
Let π(x; n, m) denote the number of primes of the form nk + m up to x. By the prime number theorem (extended to arithmetic progressions),

$$\pi(x;4,1) \sim \pi(x;4,3) \sim \frac{1}{2}\frac{x}{\log x}$$

where $\log x$ is the natural logarithm. That is, half of the primes are of the form 4k + 1, and half of the form 4k + 3. A reasonable guess would be that π(x; 4, 1) > π(x; 4, 3) and π(x; 4, 1) < π(x; 4, 3) each also occur 50% of the time. This, however, is not supported by numerical evidence — in fact, π(x; 4, 3) > π(x; 4, 1) occurs much more frequently. For example, this inequality holds for all primes x < 26833 except 5, 17, 41 and 461, for which π(x; 4, 1) = π(x; 4, 3). The first x such that π(x; 4, 1) > π(x; 4, 3) is 26861, that is, π(x; 4, 3) ≥ π(x; 4, 1) for all x < 26861.

In general, if 0 < a, b < n are integers, gcd(a, n) = gcd(b, n) = 1, a is a quadratic residue mod n, b is a quadratic nonresidue mod n, then π(x; n, b) > π(x; n, a) occurs more often than not. This has been proved only by assuming strong forms of the Riemann hypothesis. The stronger conjecture of Knapowski and Turán, that the density of the numbers x for which π(x; 4, 3) > π(x; 4, 1) holds is 1 (that is, it holds for almost all x), turned out to be false. They, however, do have a logarithmic density, which is approximately 0.9959....

== Generalizations ==
This is for k = −4 to find the smallest prime p such that $\sum_{q \le p,\ q\ \text{is prime}}\left(\frac{k}{q}\right)>0$ (where $\left(\frac{m}{n}\right)$ is the Kronecker symbol), however, for a given nonzero integer k (not only k = −4), we can also find the smallest prime p satisfying this condition. By the prime number theorem, for every nonzero integer k, there are infinitely many primes p satisfying this condition.

For positive integers k = 1, 2, 3, ..., the smallest primes p are

2, 11100143, 61981, 3, 2082927221, 5, 2, 11100143, 2, 3, 577, 61463, 2083, 11, 2, 3, 2, 11100121, 5, 2082927199, 1217, 3, 2, 5, 2, 17, 61981, 3, 719, 7, 2, 11100143, 2, 3, 23, 5, 11, 31, 2, 3, 2, 13, 17, 7, 2082927199, 3, 2, 61463, 2, 11100121, 7, 3, 17, 5, 2, 11, 2, 3, 31, 7, 5, 41, 2, 3, ... (sequence A326615 in the OEIS)

For negative integers k = −1, −2, −3, ..., the smallest primes p are

2, 3, 608981813029, 26861, 7, 5, 2, 3, 2, 11, 5, 608981813017, 19, 3, 2, 26861, 2, 643, 11, 3, 11, 31, 2, 5, 2, 3, 608981813029, 48731, 5, 13, 2, 3, 2, 7, 11, 5, 199, 3, 2, 11, 2, 29, 53, 3, 109, 41, 2, 608981813017, 2, 3, 13, 17, 23, 5, 2, 3, 2, 1019, 5, 263, 11, 3, 2, 26861, ... (sequence A392284 in the OEIS)

For fundamental discriminants of real quadratic fields (k = 1, 5, 8, 12, 13, 17, 21, 24, 28, 29, 33, 37, 40, 41, 44, 53, 56, 57, 60, 61, ... (sequence A003658 in the OEIS)), the smallest primes p are

2, 2082927221, 11100143, 61463, 2083, 2, 1217, 5, 3, 719, 2, 11, 3, 2, 7, 17, 11, 2, 7, 5, 2, 13, 2, 3, 23, 7, 3, 2, 13, 19, 2, 23, 17, 2, 5, 2, 7, 3, 2, 13, 3, 2, 19, 7, 2, 31, 31, 5, 17, 2, 13, 13, 3, 47, 2, 5, 3, 2, 37, 2, 47, 2, 5, 7, 2, 43, 2, 3, 11, 5, 3, 2, 29, ... (sequence A306499 in the OEIS)

For fundamental discriminants of imaginary quadratic fields (k = −3, −4, −7, −8, −11, −15, −19, −20, −23, −24, −31, −35, −39, −40, −43, −47, −51, −52, −55, −56, −59, ... (sequence A003657 in the OEIS)), the smallest primes p are

608981813029, 26861, 2, 3, 5, 2, 11, 3, 2, 5, 2, 11, 2, 11, 53, 2, 13, 17, 2, 3, 5, 163, 3, 2, 2, 11, 5, 2, 31, 31, 2, 2, 3, 23, 2, 41, 3, 2, 13, 47, 2, 5, 19, 7, 11, 2, 191, 2, 3, 19, 2, 15073, 3, 2, 29, 5, 2, 41, 109, 2, 11, 2, 31, 59, 3, 2, 19, 2, 11, 53, 2, 1019, 137, ... (sequence A306500 in the OEIS)

For every (positive or negative) nonsquare integer k, there are more primes p with $\left(\frac{k}{p}\right)=-1$ than with $\left(\frac{k}{p}\right)=1$ (up to the same limit) more often than not.

== Extension to higher power residue ==
Let m and n be integers such that m ≥ 0, n > 0, gcd(m, n) = 1, define a function
$$f(m,n) = \sum_{\begin{smallmatrix} p \text{ is prime,} \\ p\,\mid\,\varphi(n), \\ x^p \,\equiv\, m \pmod n \text{ has a solution} \end{smallmatrix}} \left(\frac{1}{p}\right),$$
where $\varphi$ is Euler's totient function.

For example, f(1, 5) = f(4, 5) = 1/2, f(2, 5) = f(3, 5) = 0, f(1, 6) = 1/2, f(5, 6) = 0, f(1, 7) = 5/6, f(2, 7) = f(4, 7) = 1/2, f(3, 7) = f(5, 7) = 0, f(6, 7) = 1/3, f(1, 8) = 1/2, f(3, 8) = f(5, 8) = f(7, 8) = 0, f(1, 9) = 5/6, f(2, 9) = f(5, 9) = 0, f(4, 9) = f(7, 9) = 1/2, f(8, 9) = 1/3.

It is conjectured that if 0 < a, b < n are integers, gcd(a, n) = gcd(b, n) = 1, f(a, n) > f(b, n), then π(x; n, b) > π(x; n, a) occurs more often than not.
