= Polarization constants =

In potential theory and optimization, polarization constants (also known as Chebyshev constants) are solutions to a max-min problem for potentials. Originally, these problems were introduced by a Japanese mathematician Makoto Ohtsuka. Recently these problems got some attention as they can help to generate random points on smooth manifolds (in particular, unit sphere) with prescribed probability density function. The problem of finding the polarization constant is connected to the problem of energy minimization and, in particular to the Thomson problem.

== Practical motivation ==
From the practical point of view, these problems can be used to answer the following question: if $K(x,x_j)$ denotes the amount of a substance received at $x$ due to an injector of the substance located at $x_j$, what is the smallest number of like injectors and their optimal locations on $A$ so that a prescribed minimal amount of the substance reaches every point of $A$? For example, one can relate this question to treating tumors with radioactive seeds.

== Formal Definition ==
More precisely, for a compact set $A$ and kernel $K:A\times A \to \mathbb{R}\cup\{+\infty\}$, the discrete polarization problem is the following: determine $N$-point configurations $\{x_j\}_{j=1}^N$ on $A$ so that the minimum of $\sum_{j=1}^N K(x,x_j)$ for $x\in A$ is as large as possible.

== Classical kernels ==
The Chebyshev nomenclature for this max-min problem emanates from the case when $K$ is the logarithmic kernel, $K(x,y)=\log |x-y|^{-1},$ for when $A$ is a subset of the complex plane, the problem is equivalent to finding the constrained $N$-th degree Chebyshev polynomial for $A$; that is, the monic polynomial in the complex variable $z$ with all its zeros on $A$ having minimal uniform norm on $A$.

If $A$ is the unit circle in the plane and $K(x,y)=|x-y|^{-s}$, $s>0$ (i.e., kernel of a Riesz potential), then $N$ equally spaced points on the circle solve the $N$ point polarization problem.
