= Stieltjes polynomials =

In mathematics, the Stieltjes polynomials E_{n} are polynomials associated to a family of orthogonal polynomials P_{n}. They are unrelated to the Stieltjes polynomial solutions of differential equations. Stieltjes originally considered the case where the orthogonal polynomials P_{n} are the Legendre polynomials.

The Gauss–Kronrod quadrature formula uses the zeros of Stieltjes polynomials.

== Definition ==
If P_{0}, P_{1}, form a sequence of orthogonal polynomials for some inner product, then the Stieltjes polynomial E_{n} is a degree n polynomial orthogonal to P_{n–1}(x)x^{k} for k = 0, 1, ..., n – 1.
