= Pafnuty Chebyshev =

Russian mathematician (1821–1894)

- Пафнутий Чебышёв
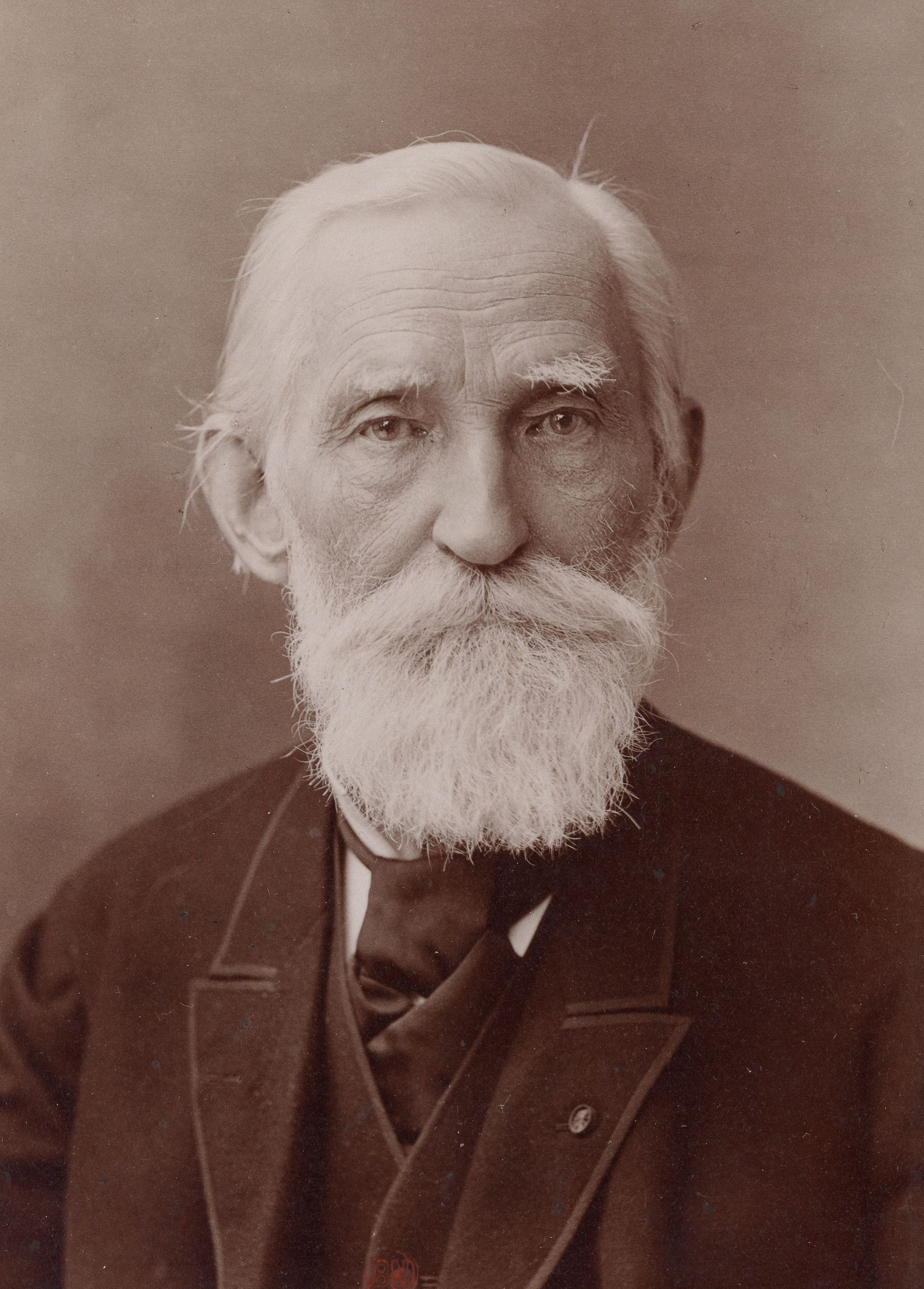
- Pafnuty Chebyshev c. 1890
- Born: 16 May 1821; Akatovo, Kaluga Governorate, Russian Empire
- Died: 8 December 1894 (aged 73); St. Petersburg, Russian Empire
- Other names: Chebysheff, Chebyshov, Tschebyscheff, Tschebycheff, Tchebycheff
- Education: Moscow University
- Known for: Work on probability, statistics, mechanics, analytical geometry and number theory
- Awards: Demidov Prize (1849)
- Scientific career
- Fields: Mathematician
- Workplaces: St. Petersburg University
- Academic advisors: Nikolai Brashman
- Notable students: Dmitry Grave; Aleksandr Korkin; Aleksandr Lyapunov; Andrey Markov; Vladimir Andreevich Markov; Konstantin Posse; Yegor Ivanovich Zolotarev

Signature
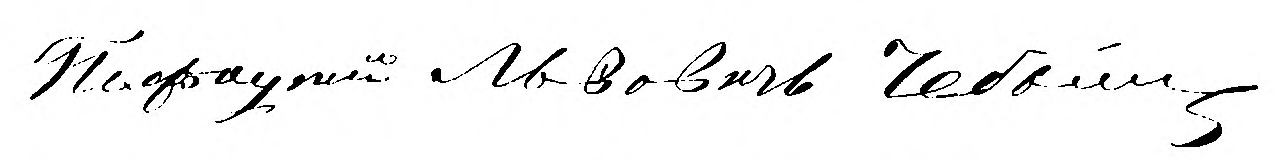

Pafnuty Lvovich Chebyshev (Russian: Пафну́тий Льво́вич Чебышёв, IPA: [pɐfˈnutʲɪj ˈlʲvovʲɪtɕ tɕɪbɨˈʂof]) (16 May [O.S. 4 May] 1821 – 8 December [O.S. 26 November] 1894) was a Russian mathematician and considered to be the founding father of Russian mathematics.

Chebyshev is known for his fundamental contributions to the fields of probability, statistics, mechanics, and number theory. A number of important mathematical concepts are named after him, including the Chebyshev inequality (which can be used to prove the weak law of large numbers), the Bertrand–Chebyshev theorem, Chebyshev polynomials, Chebyshev linkage, and Chebyshev bias.

== Transcription ==
The surname Chebyshev has been transliterated in several different ways, including Tchebichef, Tchebychev, Tchebycheff, Tschebyschev, Tschebyschef, Tschebyscheff, Čebyčev, Čebyšev, Chebysheff, Chebychov and Chebyshov (which provides the closest pronunciation in English to the correct pronunciation in old Russian). Chebychev is an erroneous mixture between English and French transliterations. In English, the transliteration Chebyshev has gained widespread acceptance. The correct transliteration according to ISO 9 is Čebyšëv. The American Mathematical Society adopted the transcription Chebyshev in its Mathematical Reviews.

His first name comes from the Greek Paphnutius (Παφνούτιος), which in turn takes its origin in the Coptic Paphnuty (Ⲡⲁⲫⲛⲟⲩϯ), meaning "that who belongs to God" or simply "the man of God".

== Biography ==
=== Early years ===
One of nine children, Chebyshev was born in the village of Okatovo in the district of Borovsk, province of Kaluga. His father, Lev Pavlovich, was a Russian nobleman and wealthy landowner. Pafnuty Lvovich was first educated at home by his mother Agrafena Ivanovna Pozniakova (in reading and writing) and by his cousin Avdotya Kvintillianovna Sukhareva (in French and arithmetic). Chebyshev mentioned that his music teacher also played an important role in his education, for she "raised his mind to exactness and analysis".

Trendelenburg's gait affected Chebyshev's adolescence and development. From childhood, he limped and walked with a stick and so his parents abandoned the idea of his becoming an officer in the family tradition. His disability prevented his playing many children's games and he devoted himself instead to mathematics.

In 1832, the family moved to Moscow, mainly to attend to the education of their eldest sons (Pafnuty and Pavel, who would become lawyers). Education continued at home and his parents engaged teachers of excellent reputation, including (for mathematics and physics) the senior Moscow University teacher Platon Pogorelsky, who had taught, among others, the future writer Ivan Turgenev.

=== University studies ===
In summer 1837, Chebyshev passed the registration examinations and, in September of that year, began his mathematical studies at the second philosophical department of Moscow University. His teachers included N.D. Brashman, N.E. Zernov and D.M. Perevoshchikov of whom it seems clear that Brashman had the greatest influence on Chebyshev. Brashman instructed him in practical mechanics and probably showed him the work of French engineer J.V. Poncelet. In 1841 Chebyshev was awarded the silver medal for his work "calculation of the roots of equations" which he had finished in 1838. In this, Chebyshev derived an approximating algorithm for the solution of algebraic equations of n^{th} degree based on Newton's method. In the same year, he finished his studies as "most outstanding candidate".

In 1841, Chebyshev's financial situation changed drastically. There was famine in Russia, and his parents were forced to leave Moscow. Although they could no longer support their son, he decided to continue his mathematical studies and prepared for the master examinations, which lasted six months. Chebyshev passed the final examination in October 1843 and, in 1846, defended his master thesis "An Essay on the Elementary Analysis of the Theory of Probability." His biographer Prudnikov suggests that Chebyshev was directed to this subject after learning of recently published books on probability theory or on the revenue of the Russian insurance industry.

=== Adult years ===
In 1847, Chebyshev promoted his thesis pro venia legendi "On integration with the help of logarithms" at St Petersburg University and thus obtained the right to teach there as a lecturer. At that time some of Leonhard Euler's works were rediscovered by P. N. Fuss and were being edited by Viktor Bunyakovsky, who encouraged Chebyshev to study them. This would come to influence Chebyshev's work. In 1848, he submitted his work The Theory of Congruences for a doctorate, which he defended in May 1849. He was elected an extraordinary professor at St Petersburg University in 1850, ordinary professor in 1860 and, after 25 years of lectureship, he became merited professor in 1872. In 1882 he left the university and devoted his life to research.

During his lectureship at the university (1852–1858), Chebyshev also taught practical mechanics at the Alexander Lyceum in Tsarskoe Selo (now Pushkin), a southern suburb of St Petersburg.

His scientific achievements were the reason for his election as junior academician (adjunkt) in 1856. Later, he became an extraordinary (1856) and in 1858 an ordinary member of the Imperial Academy of Sciences. In the same year he became an honorary member of Moscow University. He accepted other honorary appointments and was decorated several times. In 1856, Chebyshev became a member of the scientific committee of the ministry of national education. In 1859, he became an ordinary member of the ordnance department of the academy with the adoption of the headship of the commission for mathematical questions according to ordnance and experiments related to ballistics. The Paris academy elected him corresponding member in 1860 and full foreign member in 1874. In 1878, Chebyshev presented a paper on garment cutting, inspired by a lecture by Édouard Lucas, to the French Association for the Advancement of the Sciences.

In 1893, he was elected honorable member of the St. Petersburg Mathematical Society, which had been founded three years earlier.

Chebyshev died in St Petersburg on 8 December 1894.

== Mathematical contributions ==
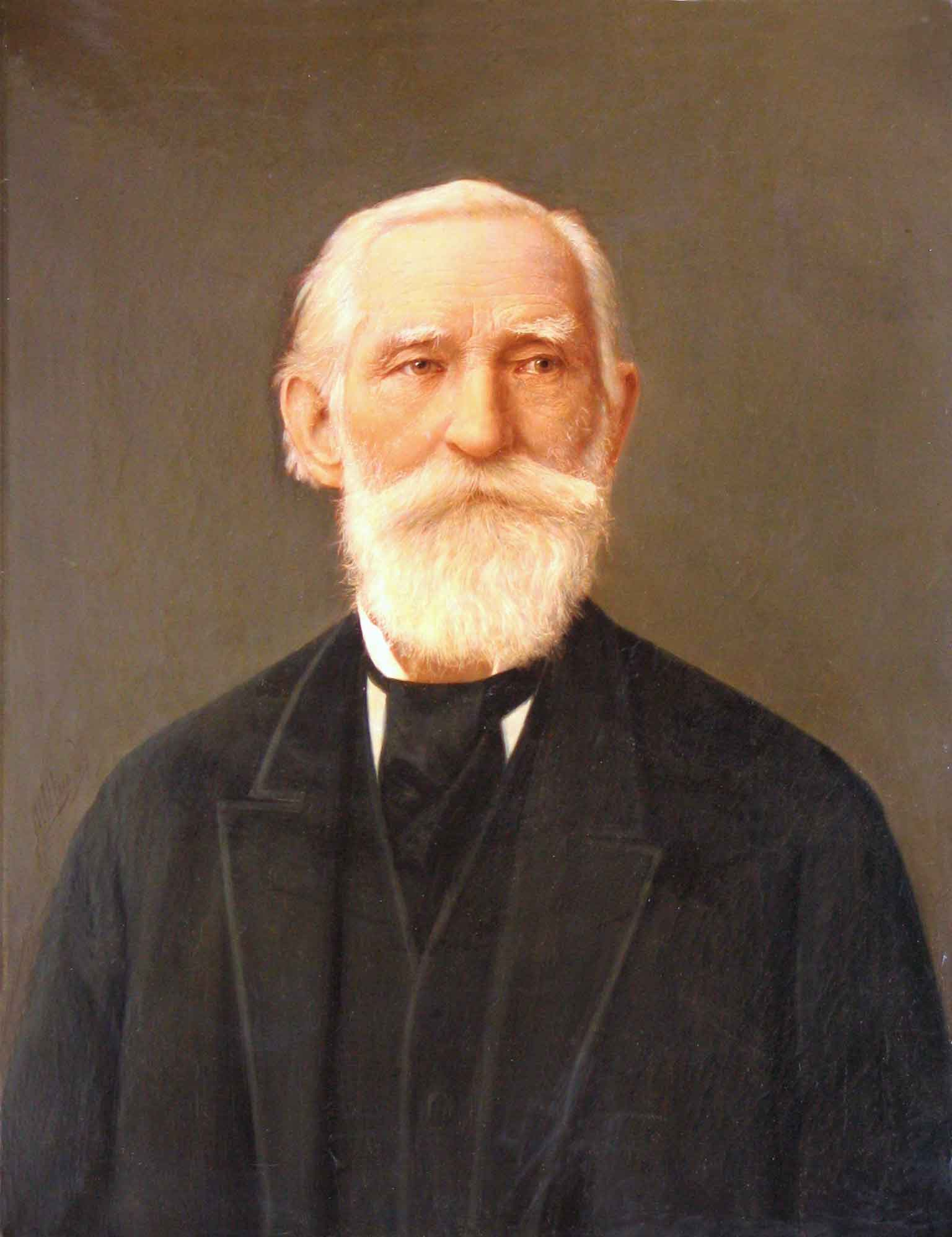
Pafnuty Chebyshev

Chebyshev is known for his work in the fields of probability, statistics, mechanics, and number theory. The Chebyshev inequality states that if $X$ is a random variable with standard deviation σ > 0, then the probability that the outcome of $X$ is $d = k\sigma$ or more away from its mean is at most $1/k^2 = \sigma^2/d^2$:

$$\Pr(|X - {\mathbf E}(X)| \ge d\ )\le \frac {\sigma^2}{d^2}.$$

The Chebyshev inequality can be used to prove the weak law of large numbers.

The Bertrand–Chebyshev theorem (1845, 1852) states that for any $n > 3$, there exists a prime number $p$ such that $n < p < 2n-2$. This is a consequence of the Chebyshev inequalities for the number $\pi(n)$ of prime numbers less than $n$:

for $x$ sufficiently large, $A\frac{x}{\log(x)} < \pi(x) < \frac{6A}{5}\frac{x}{\log(x)} \; \text{, with } \; A \approx 0.92129.$

Fifty years later, in 1896, the celebrated prime number theorem was proved, independently, by Jacques Hadamard and Charles Jean de la Vallée Poussin:

$$\lim_{x\to\infty}\frac{\;\pi(x)\log(x)\;}{x\;} = 1$$

using ideas introduced by Bernhard Riemann.

Chebyshev is also known for the Chebyshev polynomials and the Chebyshev bias – the difference between the number of primes that are congruent to 3 (modulo 4) and 1 (modulo 4).

Chebyshev was the first person to think systematically in terms of random variables and their moments and expectations.

== Legacy ==
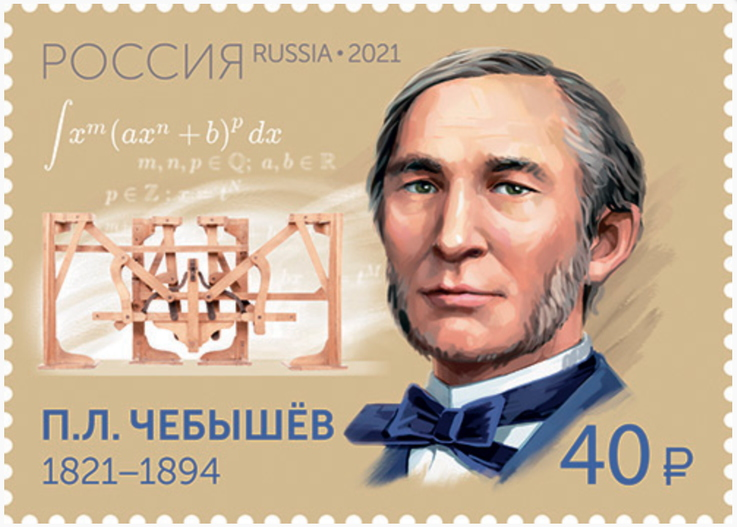
Chebyshev on a 2021 stamp of Russia

Chebyshev is considered to be a founding father of Russian mathematics. Among his well-known students were the mathematicians Dmitry Grave, Aleksandr Korkin, Aleksandr Lyapunov, and Andrei Markov. According to the Mathematics Genealogy Project, Chebyshev has 17,533 mathematical "descendants" as of January 2025.

The lunar crater Chebyshev and the asteroid 2010 Chebyshev were named to honor his major achievements in the mathematical realm.

== Publications ==
- Tchebychef, P. L. (1899), Markov, Andrey Andreevich; Sonin, N. (eds.), Oeuvres, vol. I, New York: Commissionaires de l'Académie impériale des sciences, MR 0147353, Reprinted by Chelsea 1962
- Tchebychef, P. L. (1907), Markov, Andrey Andreevich; Sonin, N. (eds.), Oeuvres, vol. II, New York: Commissionaires de l'Académie impériale des sciences, MR 0147353, Reprinted by Chelsea 1962
- Butzer, Paul; Jongmans, Francois (1999), "P. L. Chebyshev (1821–1894): A Guide to his Life and Work", Journal of Approximation Theory, 96: 111–138, doi:10.1006/jath.1998.3289

== See also ==
- List of things named after Pafnuty Chebyshev
