= Osip Somov =

Russian mathematician

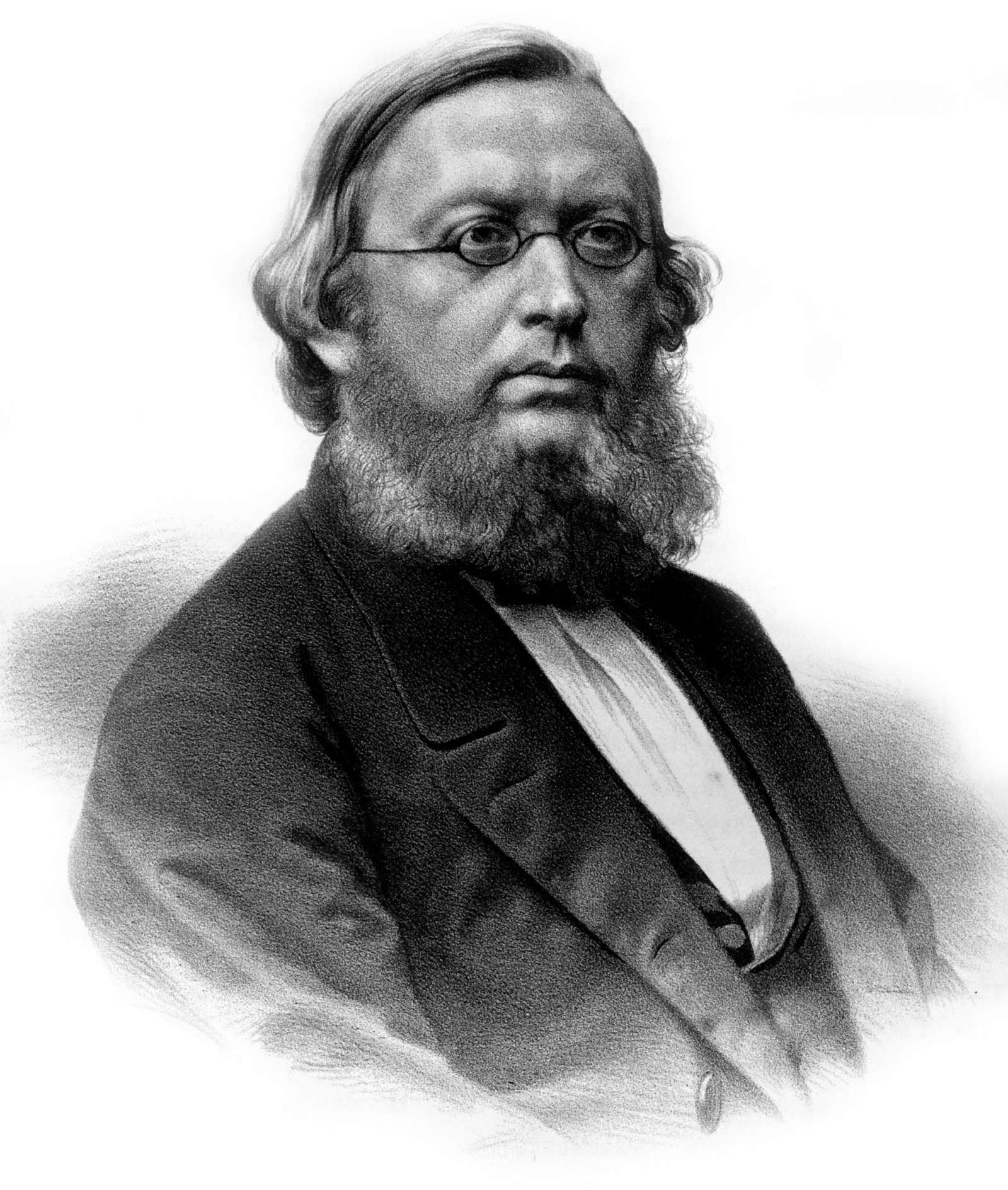
Osip Ivanovich Somov.

Osip Ivanovich Somov (Russian: Ио́сиф (О́сип) Ива́нович Со́мов; 13 June 1815, Moscow Governorate – 8 May 1876, Saint Petersburg) was a Russian mathematician.
