= Aleksandr Korkin =

Russian mathematician

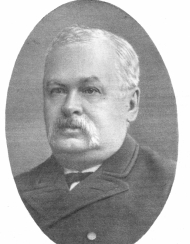
- Born: 3 March 1837; Zhidovinovo, Vologda Governorate, Russian Empire
- Died: 1 September 1908 (aged 71); Saint Petersburg, Russian Empire
- Education: St Petersburg University
- Known for: Partial Differential Equations
- Scientific career
- Fields: Mathematician
- Workplaces: St Petersburg University
- Doctoral advisor: Pafnuty Chebyshev
- Doctoral students: Yegor Zolotarev

Aleksandr Nikolayevich Korkin (Russian: Александр Николаевич Коркин; 3 March [O.S. 19 February] 1837 – 1 September [O.S. 19 August] 1908) was a Russian mathematician. He made contribution to the development of partial differential equations, and was second only to Chebyshev among the founders of the Saint Petersburg Mathematical School. Among others, his students included Yegor Ivanovich Zolotarev.

== Some publications ==
- Korkine A., Zolotareff G. (1872). "Sur les formes quadratiques positives quaternaires". Math. Ann. 5 (4): 581–583. doi:10.1007/BF01442912. S2CID 119606974.
- Korkine A., Zolotareff G. (1873). "Sur les formes quadratiques". Math. Ann. 6 (3): 366–389. doi:10.1007/BF01442795. S2CID 120492026.
- Korkine A., Zolotareff G. (1877). "Sur les formes quadratiques positives". Math. Ann. 11 (2): 242–292. doi:10.1007/BF01442667. S2CID 121803621.

== Sources ==
- "Коркин, Александр Николаевич" . Brockhaus and Efron Encyclopedic Dictionary (in Russian). 1906.
