= Bernstein's theorem =

In mathematics, Bernstein's theorem may refer to:

- Bernstein's theorem about the Sato–Bernstein polynomial
- Bernstein's problem about minimal surfaces
- Bernstein's theorem on monotone functions
- Bernstein's theorem (approximation theory)
- Bernstein's theorem (polynomials)
- Bernstein's lethargy theorem
- Bernstein–von Mises theorem
- Cantor–Bernstein theorem in set theory and order theory
- Cantor–Bernstein–Schroeder theorem in set theory
- Bernstein–Kushnirenko theorem in algebraic geometry
