= Remez =

Remez is a surname. Notable people with the name include:

- Aharon Remez (1919–1994), Israeli civil servant, politician and diplomat
- David Remez (1886–1951), Israeli politician and the country's first Minister of Transportation
- Evgeny Yakovlevich Remez (1895–1975), Soviet mathematician
- Gideon Remez (born 1946), Israeli journalist
- Jill Remez, American actress
- Robert Remez, American experimental psychologist, cognitive scientist, theoretician and teacher

== See also ==
- Remez algorithm
- Remez inequality
