= Bernstein inequality =

In mathematics, Bernstein inequality, named after Sergei Natanovich Bernstein, may refer to:

- Bernstein's inequality (mathematical analysis)
- Bernstein inequalities (probability theory)
