= Bernstein's theorem (polynomials) =

Mathematical inequality

In mathematics, Bernstein's theorem is an inequality relating the maximum modulus of a complex polynomial function on the unit disk with the maximum modulus of its derivative on the unit disk. It was proven by Sergei Bernstein while he was working on approximation theory.

== Statement ==
Let $\max_{|z|=1} |f(z)|$ denote the maximum modulus of an arbitrary function $f(z)$ on $|z|=1$, and let $f'(z)$ denote its derivative. Then for every polynomial $P(z)$ of degree $n$ we have

$$\max_{|z|=1} |P'(z)| \le n \max_{|z|=1} |P(z)|$$

and equality holds if and only if $P(z) = \alpha z^n$.

== Similar results ==
Paul Erdős conjectured that if $P(z)$ has no zeros in $|z|<1$, then $\max_{|z|=1} |P'(z)| \le \frac{n}{2} \max_{|z|=1} |P(z)|$. This was proved by Peter Lax. More generally, if $P(z)$ has no zeros in $|z|<k,$ for $k \ge 1$, then $\max_{|z|=1} |P'(z)| \le \frac{n}{1+k} \max_{|z|=1} |P(z)|$.

== See also ==
- Markov brothers' inequality
- Remez inequality
