= Sergey Stechkin =

Soviet mathematician (1920–1995)

- Born: 6 September 1920; Moscow, Russia
- Died: 22 November 1995 (aged 75); Moscow, Russia
- Education: Moscow State University
- Scientific career
- Fields: Mathematics
- Workplaces: Moscow State University; Steklov Institute of Mathematics
- Doctoral advisor: Dmitrii Menshov; Sergei Bernstein
- Doctoral students: Sergei Konyagin

Sergey Borisovich Stechkin (Russian: Серге́й Бори́сович Сте́чкин) (6 September 1920 – 22 November 1995) was a prominent Soviet mathematician who worked in theory of functions (especially in approximation theory) and number theory.

== Biography ==
Sergey Stechkin was born on 6 September 1920 in Moscow. His father (Boris Stechkin) was a Soviet turbojet engine designer, academician. His great uncle, N.Ye. Zhukovsky, was the founding father of modern aero- and hydrodynamics. His maternal grandfather, N.A. Shilov, was a notable chemist. His paternal grandfather was Sergey Solomin, a science fiction author.

Stechkin attended school 58 and then attempted to matriculate to Moscow State University. He was turned down, likely due to the fact that the Soviet regime viewed his father as a political dissident at the time. He matriculated to Gorky State University instead. A year later, he was nevertheless able to transfer to the Mechanics and Mathematics department at Moscow State University, where he studied mathematics and was a student of D. E. Menshov. Stechkin received his PhD in 1948 with a dissertation titled "On the order of best approximations of continuous functions".

Later he worked as a mathematician at the Steklov Institute of Mathematics in Moscow. He was the founder and first director of the department of the Institute in Yekaterinburg. Later this department became the Institute of Mechanics and Mathematics at the Ural branch of the Russian Academy of Sciences.

Stechkin founded, and, for more than 20 years, served as editor-in-chief for the mathematical journal “Mathematical Notes” (Russian: Математические заметки).

Stechkin served as professor of mathematics at Moscow State University and his honors include the Chebyshev Award of the Russian Academy of Sciences in 1993. He died in 1995 in Moscow from age-related chronic illness.

His contribution to mathematics include the generalization of Jackson's inequality for all $L_p$ spaces.
