= Constructive function theory =

Field of mathematical analysis

In mathematical analysis, constructive function theory is a field which studies the connection between the smoothness of a function and its degree of approximation. It is closely related to approximation theory. The term was coined by Sergei Bernstein.

== Example ==
Let f be a 2π-periodic function. Then f is α-Hölder for some 0 < α < 1 if and only if for every natural n there exists a trigonometric polynomial P_{n} of degree n such that

$$\max_{0 \leq x \leq 2\pi} | f(x) - P_n(x) | \leq \frac{C(f)}{n^\alpha},$$

where C(f) is a positive number depending on f. The "only if" is due to Dunham Jackson, see Jackson's inequality; the "if" part is due to Sergei Bernstein, see Bernstein's theorem (approximation theory).
