= Equioscillation theorem =

Theorem

In mathematics, the equioscillation theorem concerns the approximation of continuous functions using polynomials when the merit function is the maximum difference (uniform norm). Its discovery is attributed to Chebyshev.

== Statement ==
Let $f$ be a continuous function from $[a,b]$ to $\mathbb{R}$. Among all the polynomials of degree $\le n$, the polynomial $g$ minimizes the uniform norm of the difference $\| f - g \| _\infty$ if and only if there are $n+2$ points $a \le x_0 < x_1 < \cdots < x_{n+1} \le b$ such that $f(x_i) - g(x_i) = \sigma (-1)^i \| f - g \|_\infty$ where $\sigma$ is either -1 or +1.

That is, the polynomial $g$ oscillates above and below $f$ at the interpolation points, and does so to the same degree.

== Proof ==
Let us define the equioscillation condition as the condition in the theorem statement, that is, the condition that there exists $n+2$ ordered points in the interval such that the difference $f(x_i) - g(x_i)$ alternates in sign and is equal in magnitude to the uniform-norm of $f(x) - g(x)$.

We need to prove that this condition is 'sufficient' for the polynomial $g$ being the best uniform approximation to $f$, and we need to prove that this condition is 'necessary' for a polynomial to be the best uniform approximation.

=== Sufficiency ===
Assume by contradiction that a polynomial $p(x)$ of degree less than or equal to $n$ existed that provides a uniformly better approximation to $f$, which means that $\| f - p \|_\infty < \| f - g \|_\infty$. Then the polynomial

$$h(x) = g(x) - p(x) = (g(x) - f(x)) - (p(x) - f(x))$$

is also of degree less than or equal to $n$. However, for every $x_i$ of the $n+2$ points $x_0, x_1, ..., x_{n+1}$, we know that $| p(x_i) - f(x_i) | < | g(x) - f(x) |$ because $|p(x_i) - f(x_i)| \le \| f - p \|_\infty$ and $\| f - p ||_\infty < \| f - g \|_\infty$ (since $p$ is a better approximation than $g$).

Therefore, $h(x_i) = (g(x_i) - f(x_i)) - (p(x_i) - f(x_i))$ will have the same sign as $g(x_i) - f(x_i)$ (because the second term has a smaller magnitude than the first). Thus, $h(x_i)$ will also alternate sign on these $n+2$ points, and thus have at least $n+1$ roots. However, since $h$ is a 'polynomial' of at most degree $n$, it should only have at most $n$ roots. This is a contradiction.

=== Necessity ===
Given a polynomial $g$, let us define $M = \|f(x) - g(x) \|_\infty$. We will call a point $x$ an upper point if $f(x) - g(x) = M$ and a lower point if it equals $-M$ instead.

Define an alternating set (given polynomial $g$ and function $f$) to be a set of ordered points $x_0, ... x_n$ in $[a,b]$ such that for every point $x_i$ in the alternating set, we have $f(x_i) - g(x_i) = \sigma (-1)^i M$, where $\sigma$ equals $1$ or $-1$ as before.

Define a sectioned alternating set to be an alternating set $x_0, ... x_n$ along with nonempty closed intervals $I_0, ... I_n$ called sections such that 1. the sections partition $[a,b]$ (meaning that the union of the sections is the whole interval, and the intersection of any two sections is either empty or a single common endpoint) 2. For every $i$, the $i$th alternating point $x_i$ is in the $i$th section $I_i$ 3. If $x_i$ is an upper point, then $I_i$ contains no lower points. Likewise, if $x_i$ is a lower point, then $I_i$ contains no upper points.

Given an approximating polynomial $g$ that does not satisfy the equioscillation condition, it is possible to show that the polynomial will have a two point alternating set. This alternating set can then be expanded to a sectioned alternating set. We can then use this sectioned alternating set to improve the approximation, unless the sectioned alternating set has more than $n+2$ points in which case our improvement cannot be guaranteed to still be a polynomial of degree at most $n$

== Variants ==
The equioscillation theorem is also valid when polynomials are replaced by rational functions: among all rational functions whose numerator has degree $\le n$ and denominator has degree $\le m$, the rational function $g = p/q$, with $p$ and $q$ being relatively prime polynomials of degree $n-\nu$ and $m-\mu$, minimizes the uniform norm of the difference $\| f - g \| _\infty$ if and only if there are $m + n + 2 - \min\{\mu,\nu\}$ points $a \le x_0 < x_1 < \cdots < x_{m+n+1 - \min\{\mu, \nu\}} \le b$ such that $f(x_i) - g(x_i) = \sigma (-1)^i \| f - g \|_\infty$ where $\sigma$ is either -1 or +1.

== Algorithms ==
Several minimax approximation algorithms are available, the most common being the Remez algorithm.
