= U set =

U set may refer to:

- New South Wales U set
- Set of uniqueness
