= Susanne Brenner =

American mathematician

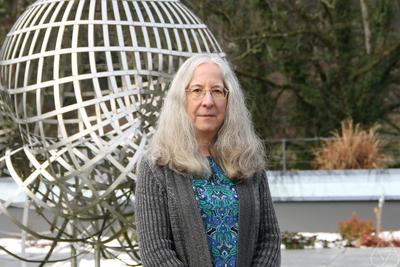
Brenner at Oberwolfach in 2018

Susanne Cecelia Brenner is an American mathematician, whose research concerns the finite element method and related techniques for the numerical solution of differential equations. She is a Boyd Professor at Louisiana State University. Previously, she held the Nicholson Professorship of Mathematics and the Michael F. and Roberta Nesbit McDonald Professorship at Louisiana State University, She currently chairs the editorial committee of the journal Mathematics of Computation. During 2021-2022 she is serving as President of the Society for Industrial and Applied Mathematics (SIAM).

== Education and career ==
Brenner did her undergraduate studies in mathematics and German at West Chester State College and received a master's degree in mathematics from SUNY Stony Brook. She obtained her Ph.D. from the University of Michigan in 1988 under the joint supervision of Jeffrey Rauch and L. Ridgway Scott; her thesis was entitled "Multigrid Methods for Nonconforming Finite Elements".

She held faculty positions at Clarkson University and the University of South Carolina before moving to Louisiana State University in 2006.

== Selected publications ==
- $C^0$interior penalty methods for fourth order elliptic boundary value problems on polygonal domains. J. Sci. Comput. 22/23 (2005), 83–118.
- Korn's inequalities for piecewise vector fields. Math. Comp. 73 (2004), no. 247, 1067–1087.
- Poincaré-Friedrichs inequalities for piecewise $H^1$functions. SIAM J. Numer. Anal. 41 (2003), no. 1, 306–324.
- with L. R. Scott, The Mathematical Theory of Finite Element Methods (Springer-Verlag, 1994; 3rd edition, 2008).

== Recognition ==
She is a fellow of the Society for Industrial and Applied Mathematics, the American Mathematical Society, and the American Association for the Advancement of Science. The Association for Women in Mathematics has included her in the 2020 class of AWM Fellows for "being a role model nationally and internationally due to her widely-known work in finite element methods; for her promotion of women in mathematics via the Women in Numerical Analysis and Scientific Computing network, as mentor of Ph.D.s, and as advisor of graduate and undergraduate students". Brenner was also awarded a Humboldt Forschungspreis (Humboldt Research Award) from the Alexander von Humboldt Foundation in 2005.

She is included in a deck of playing cards featuring notable women mathematicians published by the Association of Women in Mathematics.
