= M-set =

M-set may refer to

- Sydney Trains M set, a class of electric train
- Set of uniqueness or Menshov set of harmonic analysis
- Mandelbrot set, a two-dimensional fractal shape
- A monoid acting on a set; see Semigroup action
