= EJA =

Eja or EJA may refer to:

== Scholarly journals ==
- East Journal on Approximations
- European Journal of Anaesthesiology
- European Journal of Archaeology

== Other uses ==
- Eja (born 1972), Malaysian actress
- Ejamat language
- European Juggling Association
- NetJets, an American jet charter company
- Yariguíes Airport, in Colombia
