= Jackson's theorem =

Jackson's theorem may refer to:

- Jackson networks, in queueing theory (after James R. Jackson)
- Jackson's inequality, in analysis (after Dunham Jackson)
