= Whitney inequality =

In mathematics, the Whitney inequality gives an upper bound for the error of best approximation of a function by polynomials in terms of the moduli of smoothness. It was first proved by Hassler Whitney in 1957, and is an important tool in the field of approximation theory for obtaining upper estimates on the errors of best approximation.

== Statement of the theorem ==
Denote the value of the best uniform approximation of a function $f\in C([a,b])$ by algebraic polynomials $P_n$ of degree $\leq n$ by

$$E_n(f)_{[a,b]} := \inf_{P_n}{\| f-P_n \|_{C([a,b])}}$$

The moduli of smoothness of order $k$ of a function $f\in C([a,b])$ are defined as:

$$\omega_k(t):=\omega_k(t;f;[a,b]) :=\sup_{h\in [0,t]} \|\Delta_h^k(f;\cdot)\|_{C([a,b-kh])} \quad \text{ for } \quad t\in [0,(b-a)/k],$$

$$\omega_k(t):=\omega_k((b-a)/k)\quad \text{ for} \quad t>(b-a)/k ,$$

where $\Delta_h^k$ is the finite difference of order $k$.

Theorem: [Whitney, 1957] If $f\in C([a,b])$, then

$$E_{k-1}(f)_{[a,b]}\leq W_k \omega_k\left(\frac{b-a}{k};f;[a,b]\right)$$

where $W_k$ is a constant depending only on $k$. The Whitney constant $W(k)$ is the smallest value of $W_k$ for which the above inequality holds. The theorem is particularly useful when applied on intervals of small length, leading to good estimates on the error of spline approximation.

== Proof ==
The original proof given by Whitney follows an analytic argument which utilizes the properties of moduli of smoothness. However, it can also be proved in a much shorter way using Peetre's K-functionals.

Let:

$$x_0:=a, \quad h:=\frac{b-a}{k}, \quad x_j:=x+0+jh, \quad F(x) = \int_a^x f(u) \, du,$$

$$G(x):=F(x)-L(x;F;x_0,\ldots,x_k), \quad g(x):=G'(x),$$

$$\omega_k(t):=\omega_k(t;f;[a,b])\equiv \omega_k(t;g;[a,b])$$

where $L(x;F;x_0,\ldots,x_k)$ is the Lagrange polynomial for $F$ at the nodes $\{x_0,\ldots,x_k\}$.

Now fix some $x\in [a,b]$ and choose $\delta$ for which $(x+k\delta)\in [a,b]$. Then:

$$\int_0^1 \Delta_{t\delta}^k (g;x) \, dt =(-1)^kg(x)+\sum_{j=1}^k (-1)^{k-j} \binom{k}{j} \int_0^1 g(x+jt\delta) \, dt$$

$$=(-1)^kg(x)+\sum_{j=1}^k{(-1)^{k-j} \binom{k}{j} \frac{1}{j\delta}(G(x+j\delta)-G(x))},$$

Therefore:

$$|g(x)| \leq \int_0^1 |\Delta_{t\delta}^k(g;x)| \, dt + \frac{2}{|\delta|}\|G\|_{C([a,b])} \sum_{j=1}^k \binom{k}{j}\frac{1}{j} \leq \omega_k(|\delta|)+\frac{1}{|\delta|}2^{k+1}\|G\|_{C([a,b])}$$

And since we have $\|G\|_{C([a,b])}\leq h\omega_k(h)$, (a property of moduli of smoothness)

$$E_{k-1}(f)_{[a,b]}\leq \|g\|_{C([a,b])} \leq \omega_k(|\delta|) +\frac{1}{|\delta|} h 2^{k+1}\omega_k(h).$$

Since $\delta$ can always be chosen in such a way that $h\geq |\delta| \geq h/2$, this completes the proof.

== Whitney constants and Sendov's conjecture ==
It is important to have sharp estimates of the Whitney constants. It is easily shown that $W(1)=1/2$, and it was first proved by Burkill (1952) that $W(2)\leq 1$, who conjectured that $W(k)\leq 1$ for all $k$. Whitney was also able to prove that

$$W(2)=\frac{1}{2}, \quad \frac{8}{15}\leq W(3) \leq 0.7 \quad W(4)\leq 3.3 \quad W(5)\leq 10.4$$

and

$$W(k)\geq \frac{1}{2},\quad k\in\mathbb{N}$$

In 1964, Brudnyi was able to obtain the estimate $W(k)=O(k^{2k})$, and in 1982, Sendov proved that $W(k)\leq (k+1)k^k$. Then, in 1985, Ivanov and Takev proved that $W(k)=O(k\ln k)$, and Binev proved that $W(k)=O(k)$. Sendov conjectured that $W(k)\leq 1$ for all $k$, and in 1985 was able to prove that the Whitney constants are bounded above by an absolute constant, that is, $W(k)\leq 6$ for all $k$. Kryakin, Gilewicz, and Shevchuk (2002) were able to show that $W(k)\leq 2$ for $k \leq 82000$, and that $W(k)\leq 2+\frac{1}{e^2}$ for all $k$.
