= Rademacher–Menchov theorem =

In mathematical analysis, the Rademacher–Menchov theorem, introduced by Rademacher (1922) and Menchoff (1923), gives a sufficient condition for a series of orthogonal functions on an interval to converge almost everywhere.

== Statement ==
If the coefficients c_{ν} of a series of bounded orthogonal functions on an interval satisfy

$$\sum |c_\nu|^2\log(\nu)^2<\infty$$

then the series converges almost everywhere.
