= Dunham Jackson =

American mathematician (1888–1946)

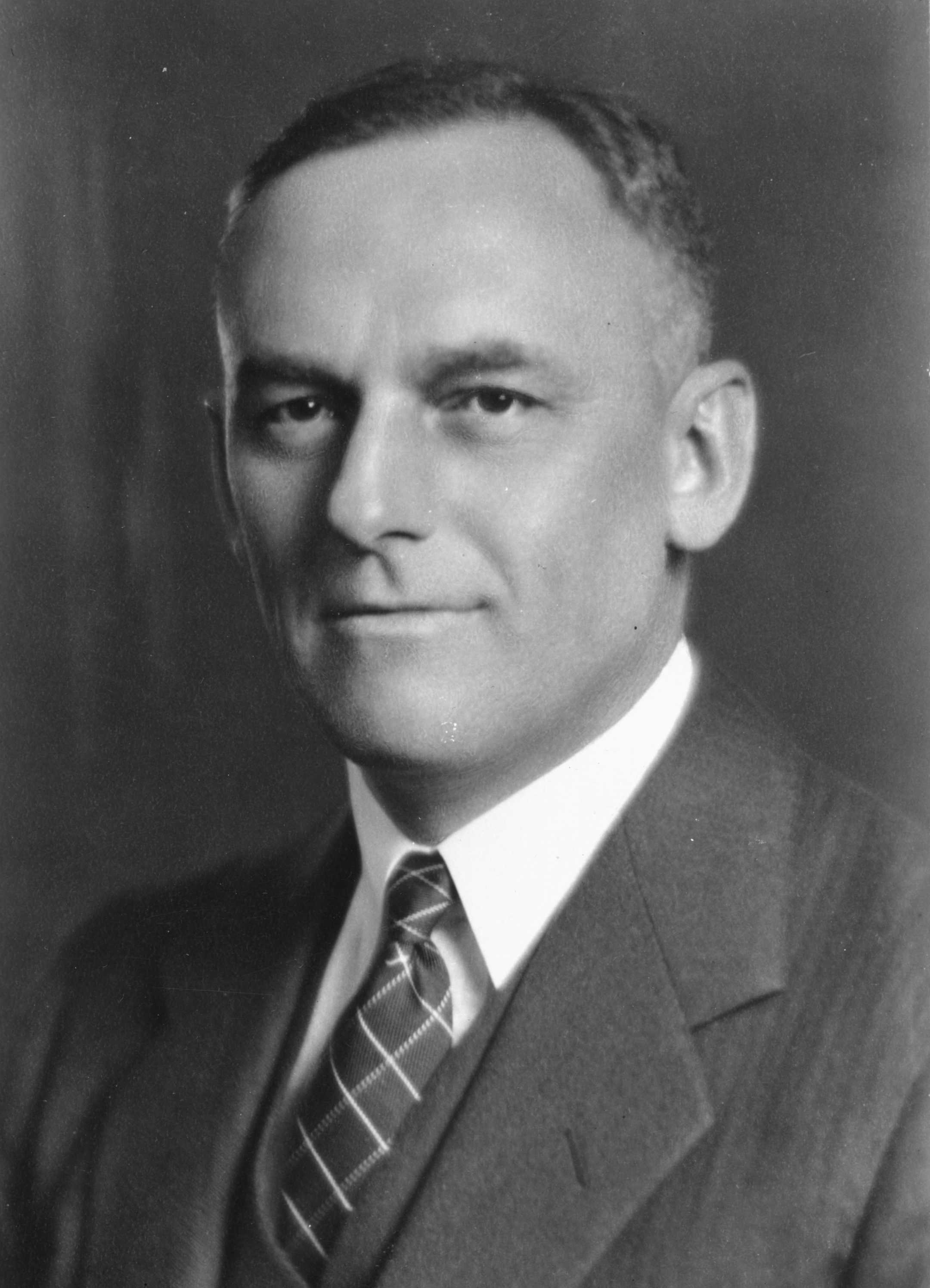
- Born: 24 July 1888
- Died: 6 November 1946 (aged 58)
- Awards: Chauvenet Prize (1935)
- Scientific career
- Fields: mathematician
- Doctoral students: Sally Elizabeth Carlson

Dunham Jackson (July 24, 1888 in Bridgewater, Massachusetts – November 6, 1946) was a mathematician who worked within approximation theory, notably with trigonometrical and orthogonal polynomials. He is known for Jackson's inequality. He was awarded the Chauvenet Prize in 1935. His book Fourier Series and Orthogonal Polynomials (dated 1941) was reprinted in 2004.

== Career ==
After attending the local school in Bridgewater, Jackson went up to Harvard in 1904 at the age of 16 to study mathematics, graduating A.B in 1908 and A.M. in 1909. He then moved to continue his studies at Göttingen for two years with the help of Harvard Fellowships. He returned to Harvard in 1911 as an instructor in mathematics and was promoted assistant professor in 1916. During the First World War he became an officer in the Ordnance Department where he produced a booklet of range tables for the artillery. In 1919 he took up a professorship in mathematics at the University of Minnesota, remaining there until his death.

While at Minnesota he won the Chauvenet Prize from the Mathematical Association of America in 1935 and was inducted as a Fellow of the American Physical Society in 1936.

== Private life ==
He married Harriet Spratt Hulley in 1918; they had two daughters, Anne Hulley Jackson and Mary Eloise Jackson.

== Publications ==
- Dunham Jackson: The Theory of Approximation. AMS, 1930.
- Dunham Jackson: Fourier Series and Orthogonal Polynomials. Carus Mathematical Monographs, 1941.
