= Genetic algebra =

Algebraic structure used to model inheritance in genetics

In mathematical genetics, a genetic algebra is a (possibly non-associative) algebra used to model inheritance in genetics. Some variations of these algebras are called train algebras, special train algebras, gametic algebras, Bernstein algebras, copular algebras, zygotic algebras, and baric algebras (also called weighted algebra). The study of these algebras was started by Ivor Etherington (1939).

In applications to genetics, these algebras often have a basis corresponding to the genetically different gametes, and the structure constants of the algebra encode the probabilities of producing offspring of various types. The laws of inheritance are then encoded as algebraic properties of the algebra.

For surveys of genetic algebras see Bertrand (1966), Wörz-Busekros (1980) and Reed (1997).

== Baric algebras ==
Baric algebras (or weighted algebras) were introduced by Etherington (1939). A baric algebra over a field K is a possibly non-associative algebra over K together with a homomorphism w, called the weight, from the algebra to K.

== Bernstein algebras ==
A Bernstein algebra, based on the work of Sergei Natanovich Bernstein (1923) on the Hardy–Weinberg law in genetics, is a (possibly non-associative) baric algebra B over a field K with a weight homomorphism w from B to K satisfying $(x^2)^2 = w(x)^2 x^2$. Every such algebra has idempotents e of the form $e = a^2$ with $w(a)=1$. The Peirce decomposition of B corresponding to e is

$$B = Ke \oplus U_e \oplus Z_e$$

where $U_e = \{ a \in \ker w : ea = a/2 \}$ and $Z_e = \{ a \in \ker w : ea = 0 \}$. Although these subspaces depend on e, their dimensions are invariant and constitute the type of B. An exceptional Bernstein algebra is one with $U_e^2 = 0$.

== Copular algebras ==
Copular algebras were introduced by Etherington (1939, section 8)

== Evolution algebras ==
An evolution algebra over a field is an algebra with a basis on which multiplication is defined by the product of distinct basis terms being zero and the square of each basis element being a linear form in basis elements. A real evolution algebra is one defined over the reals: it is non-negative if the structure constants in the linear form are all non-negative. An evolution algebra is necessarily commutative and flexible but not necessarily associative or power-associative.

== Gametic algebras ==
A gametic algebra is a finite-dimensional real algebra for which all structure constants lie between 0 and 1.

== Genetic algebras ==
Genetic algebras were introduced by Schafer (1949) who showed that special train algebras are genetic algebras and genetic algebras are train algebras.

== Special train algebras ==
Special train algebras were introduced by Etherington (1939, section 4) as special cases of baric algebras.

A special train algebra is a baric algebra in which the kernel N of the weight function is nilpotent and the principal powers of N are ideals.

Etherington (1941) showed that special train algebras are train algebras.

== Train algebras ==
Train algebras were introduced by Etherington (1939, section 4) as special cases of baric algebras.

Let $c_1, \ldots, c_n$ be elements of the field K with $1 + c_1 + \cdots + c_n = 0$. The formal polynomial

$$x^n + c_1 w(x)x^{n-1} + \cdots + c_n w(x)^n$$

is a train polynomial. The baric algebra B with weight w is a train algebra if

$$a^n + c_1 w(a)a^{n-1} + \cdots + c_n w(a)^n = 0$$

for all elements $a \in B$, with $a^k$ defined as principal powers, $(a^{k-1})a$.

== Zygotic algebras ==
Zygotic algebras were introduced by Etherington (1939, section 7)
