= Margaret P. Martin =

American statistician

- Born: April 22, 1915; Duluth, Minnesota
- Died: May 3, 2012 (aged 97); Roseville, Minnesota
- Occupation: Mathematician

Academic background
- Education: University of Minnesota
- Thesis: Some new systems of orthogonal polynomials on algebraic curves (1944)
- Academic advisor: Dunham Jackson

Academic work
- Discipline: Statistics
- Sub-discipline: Biostatistics
- Institutions: Vanderbilt University, University of Minnesota, Columbia University, Syracuse University, Johns Hopkins University, U.S.D.A. Forest Service

Margaret Pearl Martin (April 22, 1915 – May 3, 2012) was an American statistician, associated with the University of Minnesota. Most of her statistical research was performed as a consultant on public health studies, in connection with her work teaching statistics in medical schools.

== Education and career ==
Martin was born in Duluth, and became valedictorian of her high school in Saint Paul, Minnesota. She writes that she was pushed into her academic career by her mother, who had quit a teaching job to become married and was disappointed by that decision. She earned a bachelor's, master's degree, and Ph.D. in mathematics from the University of Minnesota. At Minnesota, she found mentors in two older women mathematicians, Gladys Gibbens and Sally Elizabeth Carlson. Her 1944 dissertation, Some new systems of orthogonal polynomials on algebraic curves, was in pure mathematics, but she also graduated with a minor in biostatistics.

She became an instructor of biostatistics at Columbia University for the rest of World War II, while also consulting for the New York City Health Department, and then in 1945 obtained an assistant professorship in biostatistics at Minnesota. Not long after, she moved again, to Vanderbilt University, where in the 1950s she co-authored many of her most significant research contributions as part of the Vanderbilt cooperative study of maternal and infant nutrition. After postdoctoral study at the University of Chicago she also taught at Syracuse University and Johns Hopkins University before returning a third time to the University of Minnesota as a faculty member again.

After over twenty years and two tenured positions in academia, and desiring to be closer to her aging parents, Martin retired from her faculty position and joined the United States Forest Service, where she worked for another twenty years before retiring again.

== Recognition ==
In 1964 Martin was elected as a Fellow of the American Statistical Association "for her skill in imparting her knowledge of biometrics and statistics to others; and for her services in the biomentrics profession".
