= Dmitrii Menshov =

Russian mathematician

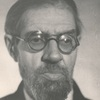
- Born: Dmitrii Yevgenyevich Menshov; 18 April 1892; Moscow, Russian Empire
- Died: 25 November 1988 (aged 96); Moscow, Soviet Union
- Education: Moscow State University
- Scientific career
- Fields: Mathematics
- Workplaces: Moscow State University
- Doctoral advisor: Dmitri Egorov; Nikolai Luzin
- Doctoral students: Alexander Brudno; Sergey Stechkin; Hoàng Tụy

Dmitrii Yevgenyevich Menshov (also spelled Men'shov, Menchoff, Menšov, Menchov; Russian: Дми́трий Евгéньевич Меньшóв; 18 April 1892 – 25 November 1988) was a Soviet and Russian mathematician known for his contributions to the theory of trigonometric series.

== Biography ==
Dmitrii Menshov studied languages as a schoolboy, but from the age of 13 he began to show great interest in mathematics and physics. In 1911, he completed high school with a gold medal. After a semester at the Moscow Engineering School, he enrolled at Moscow State University in 1912 and became a student of Nikolai Luzin.

In 1916, Menshov completed his dissertation on the topic of trigonometric series. He became a docent of Moscow State University in 1918. Soon after, he moved to Nizhny Novgorod where he was appointed a professor of the Ivanovsky Pedagogical Institute. After a few years, he returned to Moscow in 1922 and began to teach at Moscow State University.

In 1935, Menshov became a full professor of Moscow State University and was awarded the title of Doctor of Physical and Mathematical Sciences. He gave lectures at Moscow State University and also Moscow State Pedagogical University in numerical analysis, complex functions, and differential equations to undergraduate and graduate students. In this position, he taught and influenced an entire generation of young up-and-coming Russian mathematicians and physicists, including such renowned scientists as his student Sergey Stechkin. He received the Stalin Prize in 1951 and was elected to the position of corresponding member of the Russian Academy of Sciences in 1953.

His construction of a Fourier series with non-zero coefficients which converges to zero almost everywhere gave rise to the theory of Menshov sets.

He proved the Rademacher–Menchov theorem, the Looman–Menchoff theorem, and the Lusin–Menchoff theorem.

Menshov was an Invited Speaker of the ICM in 1928 in Bologna and in 1958 in Edinburgh.
