= Fedor Nazarov =

Russian mathematician (born 1967)

Fedor (Fedya) L'vovich Nazarov (Russian: Фёдор (Фе́дя) Льво́вич Наза́ров; born 1967) is a Russian mathematician working in the United States. He has done research in mathematical analysis and its applications, in particular in functional analysis and classical analysis (including harmonic analysis, Fourier analysis, and complex analytic functions).

== Biography ==
Fedor Nazarov received his Ph.D. from St Petersburg University in 1993, with Victor Petrovich Havin as advisor. Before his Ph.D. studies, Nazarov received the Gold Medal and Special prize at the International Mathematics Olympiad in 1984.

Nazarov worked at Michigan State University in East Lansing from 1995 to 2007 and at the University of Wisconsin–Madison from 2007 to 2011. Since 2011, he has been a full professor of Mathematics at Kent State University.

== Awards ==
Nazarov was awarded the Salem Prize in 1999 "for his work in harmonic analysis, in particular, the uncertainty principle, and his contribution to the development of Bellman function methods".

He gave an invited talk at the International Congress of Mathematicians in 2010, on the topic of "Analysis".

== See also ==
- Nazarov's inequality for exponential sums
