= Lethargy theorem =

Mathematical theorem

In mathematics, a lethargy theorem is a statement about the distance of points in a metric space from members of a sequence of subspaces; one application in numerical analysis is to approximation theory, where such theorems quantify the difficulty of approximating general functions by functions of special form, such as polynomials. In more recent work, the convergence of a sequence of operators is studied: these operators generalise the projections of the earlier work.

== Bernstein's lethargy theorem ==
Let $V_1 \subset V_2 \subset \ldots$ be a strictly ascending sequence of finite-dimensional linear subspaces of a Banach space X, and let $\epsilon_1 \ge \epsilon_2 \ge \ldots$ be a decreasing sequence of real numbers tending to zero. Then there exists a point x in X such that the distance of x to V_{i} is exactly $\epsilon_i$.

== See also ==
- Bernstein's theorem (approximation theory)
