= Ami Harten =

American-Israeli applied mathematician

Amiram Harten
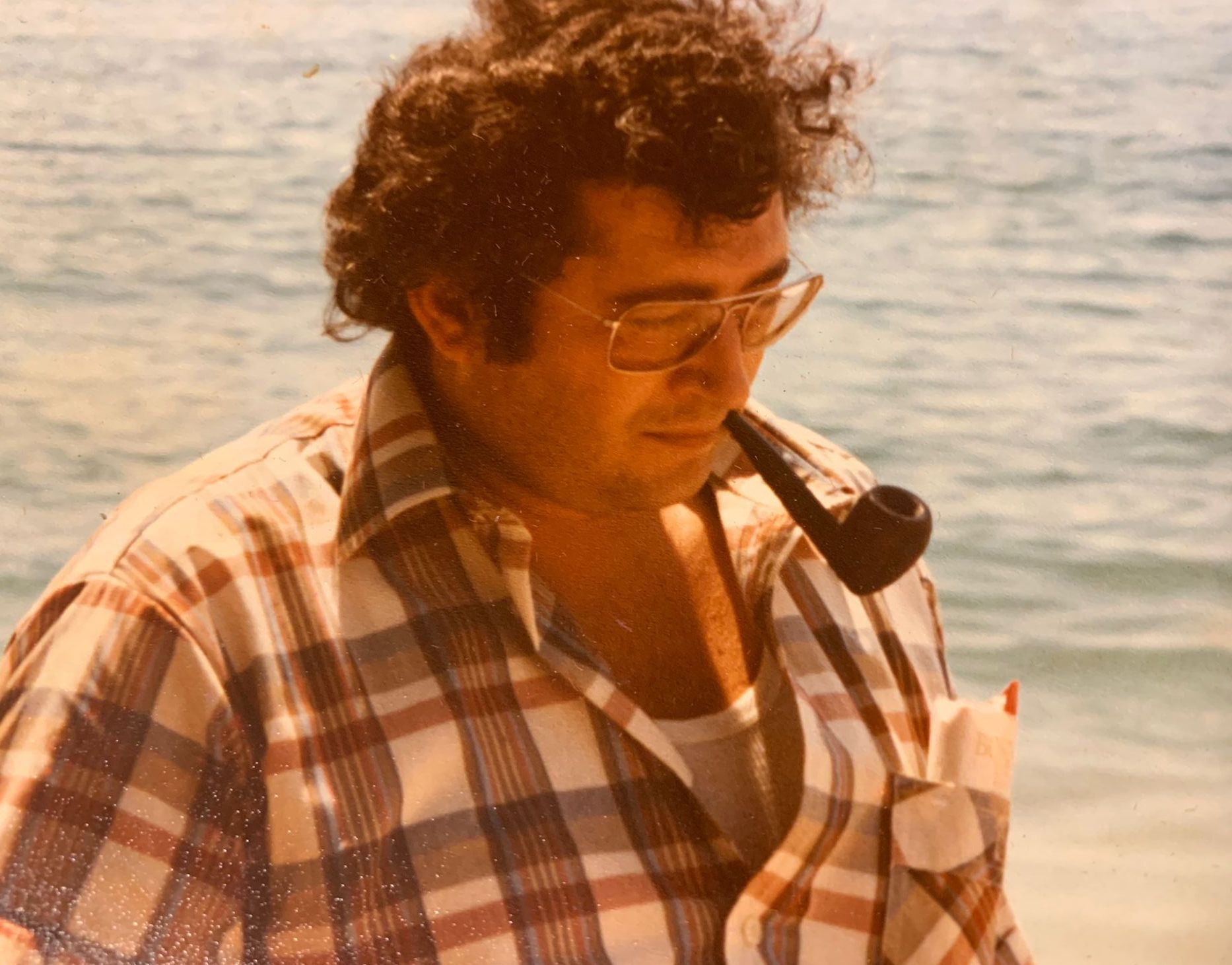
- Born: 1946
- Died: 1994
- Education: New York University
- Known for: TVD scheme Essentially non-oscillatory scheme Shock capturing schemes
- Scientific career
- Fields: Applied Mathematics
- Workplaces: Tel Aviv University, UCLA
- Doctoral advisor: Peter Lax

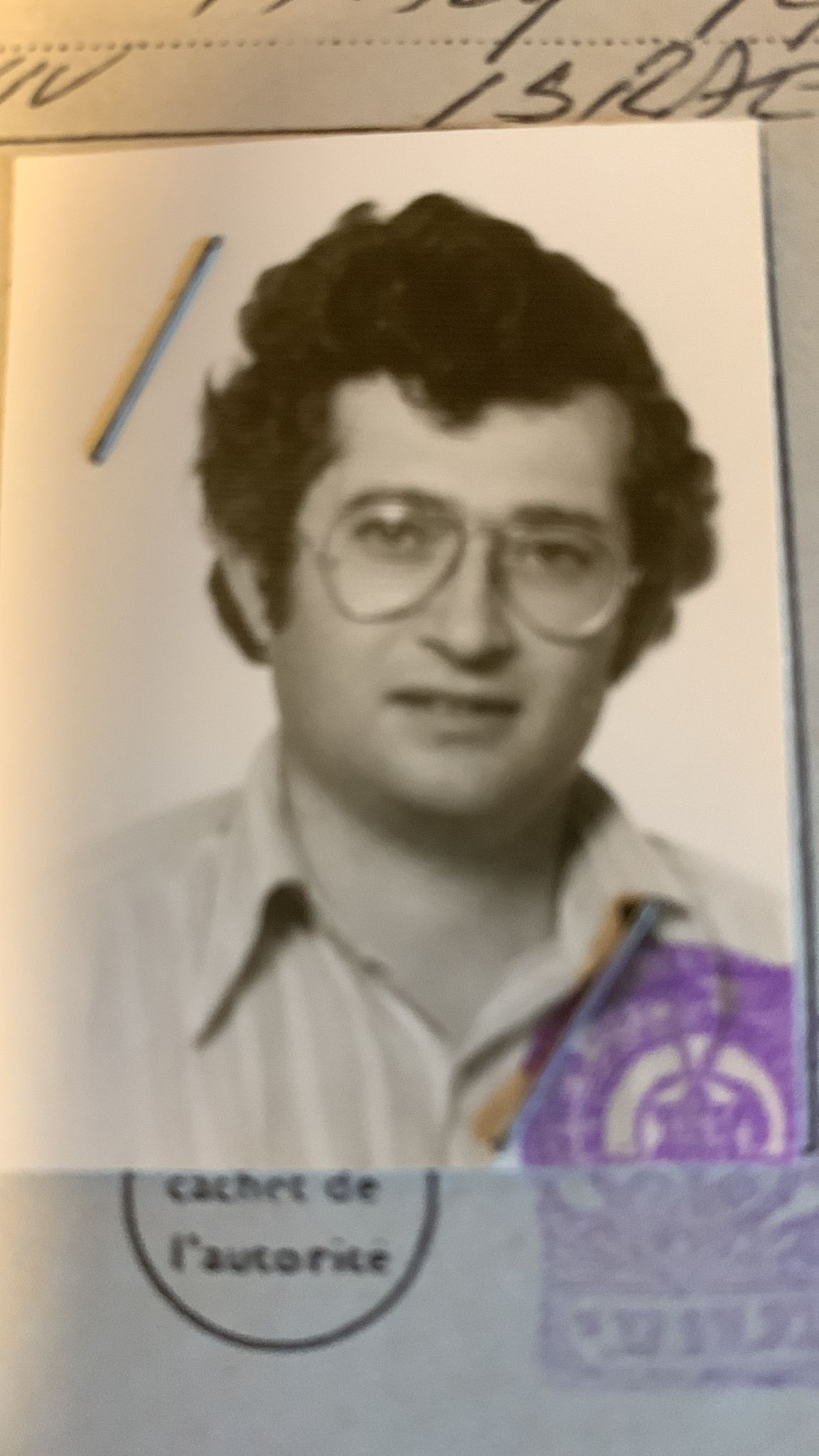

Amiram Harten (1946–1994) was an American-Israeli applied mathematician. Harten made fundamental contribution to the development of high-resolution schemes for the solution of hyperbolic partial differential equations. Among other contributions, he developed the total variation diminishing scheme, which gives an oscillation free solution for flow with shocks.

In 1980s, Harten along with Björn Engquist, Stanley Osher, and Sukumar R. Chakravarthy developed the essentially non-oscillatory (ENO) schemes. The article on ENO, titled, Uniformly High Order Accurate Essentially Non-oscillatory Schemes, III was published in Journal of Computational Physics, in 1987 and is one of the most cited papers in the field of scientific computing. It was republished in 1997 in the same journal. Harten is listed as an ISI highly cited researcher.

In 1990 Harten gave a talk on "Recent developments in shock-capturing schemes" at the International Congress of Mathematicians in Kyoto.
