= Sergei Bernstein =

Soviet mathematician

- Born: Sergei Natanovich Bernstein; 5 March 1880; Odessa, Kherson Governorate, Russian Empire
- Died: 26 October 1968 (aged 88); Moscow, Soviet Union
- Education: University of Paris
- Known for: Bernstein's inequality in analysis Bernstein inequalities in probability theory Bernstein polynomial Bernstein's theorem (approximation theory); Bernstein's theorem on monotone functions Bernstein problem in mathematical genetics
- Scientific career
- Fields: Mathematics
- Workplaces: University of Paris; University of Göttingen; University of Kharkiv; Leningrad University; Steklov Institute of Mathematics
- Doctoral advisor: Charles Émile Picard; David Hilbert
- Doctoral students: Yakov Geronimus; Sergey Stechkin

Sergei Natanovich Bernstein (Ukrainian: Сергі́й Ната́нович Бернште́йн, sometimes Romanized as Bernshtein; 5 March 1880 – 26 October 1968) was a Ukrainian and Soviet mathematician of Jewish origin known for contributions to partial differential equations, differential geometry, probability theory, and approximation theory.

== Life ==
Bernstein was born into the Jewish family of prominent Ukrainian physiologist Nathaniel Bernstein in Odessa. Sergei was brought up in Odessa but his father died on 4 February 1891 just before he was eleven years old. He graduated from high school in 1898. After this, following his mother's wishes, he went with his elder sister to Paris. Bernstein's sister studied biology in Paris and did not return to Ukraine but worked at the Pasteur Institute. After one year studying mathematics at the Sorbonne, Bernstein decided that he would rather become an engineer and entered the École supérieure d'électricité. However, he continued to be interested in mathematics and spent three terms at the University of Göttingen, beginning in the autumn of 1902, where his studies were supervised by David Hilbert. Bernstein returned to Paris and submitted his doctoral dissertation "Sur la nature analytique des solutions des équations aux dérivées partielles du second ordre" to the Sorbonne in the spring of 1904. He returned to Russia in 1905 and taught at Kharkiv University from 1908 to 1933. He was made an ordinary professor in 1920. Bernstein later worked at the Mathematical Institute of the USSR Academy of Sciences in Leningrad, and also taught at the University and Polytechnic Institute. From January 1939, Bernstein also worked also at Moscow University. He and his wife were evacuated to Borovoe, Kazakhstan in 1941. From 1943 he worked at the Mathematical Institute in Moscow, and edited Chebyshev’s complete works. In 1947 he was dismissed from the university and became head of the Department of Constructive Function Theory at the Steklov Institute. He died in Moscow in 1968.

== Work ==
=== Partial differential equations ===
In his doctoral dissertation, submitted in 1904 to the Sorbonne, Bernstein solved Hilbert's nineteenth problem on the analytic solution of elliptic differential equations (for C 3 solutions). His later work was devoted to Dirichlet's boundary problem for non-linear equations of elliptic type, where, in particular, he introduced a priori estimates.

=== Probability theory ===
In 1917, Bernstein suggested the first axiomatic foundation of probability theory, based on the underlying algebraic structure. It was later superseded by the measure-theoretic approach of Kolmogorov.

In the 1920s, he introduced a method for proving limit theorems for sums of dependent random variables.

=== Approximation theory ===
Through his application of Bernstein polynomials, he laid the foundations of constructive function theory, a field studying the connection between smoothness properties of a function and its approximations by polynomials. In particular, he proved the Weierstrass approximation theorem in 1912 and Bernstein's theorem (approximation theory). Bernstein polynomials also form the mathematical basis for Bézier curves, which later became important in computer graphics.

== International Congress of Mathematicians ==
Bernstein was an invited speaker at the International Congress of Mathematicians (ICM) in Cambridge, England in 1912 and in Bologna in 1928 and a plenary speaker at the ICM in Zurich. His plenary address Sur les liaisons entre quantités aléatoires was read by Bohuslav Hostinsky.

== Honors and awards ==
- Academician of the Academy of Sciences of the Soviet Union (1929)
- Member of the German Mathematical Society (1926)
- Member of the French Mathematical Society (1944)
- Honorary Doctor of Science of the University of Algiers (1944)
- Honorary Doctor of Science of the University of Paris (1945)
- Foreign member of the French Academy of Sciences (1955)
- Stalin Prize (1942)
- Order of Lenin (1945)
- Order of the Red Banner of Labour (1944)

== Publications ==
- S. N. Bernstein, Collected Works (Russian):
  - vol. 1, The Constructive Theory of Functions (1905–1930), translated: Atomic Energy Commission, Springfield, Va, 1958
  - vol. 2, The Constructive Theory of Functions (1931–1953)
  - vol. 3, Differential equations, calculus of variations and geometry (1903–1947)
  - vol. 4, Theory of Probability. Mathematical statistics (1911–1946)
- S. N. Bernstein, The Theory of Probabilities (Russian), Moscow, Leningrad, 1946

== See also ==
- A priori estimate
- Bernstein algebra
- Bernstein's inequality (mathematical analysis)
- Bernstein inequalities in probability theory
- Bernstein polynomial
- Bernstein's problem
- Bernstein's theorem (approximation theory)
- Bernstein's theorem on monotone functions
- Bernstein–von Mises theorem
- Stone–Weierstrass theorem
