= Boris Korenblum =

Soviet-Israeli-American mathematician

- Борис Исаакович Коренблюм
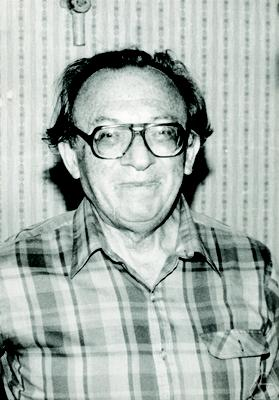
- Korenblum in 1987
- Born: August 12, 1923; Odessa, Soviet Union (now Ukraine)
- Died: December 15, 2011 (aged 88); Slingerlands, New York, United States
- Education: Institute of Mathematics, National Academy of Sciences of Ukraine, Moscow State University
- Known for: Harmonic analysis, functional analysis, Banach algebras, complex analysis
- Awards: Order of the Red Banner
- Scientific career
- Fields: Mathematical analysis
- Workplaces: Tel Aviv University, Institute for Advanced Study, University at Albany, SUNY
- Doctoral advisor: Evgeny Yakovlevich Remez

Boris Isaac Korenblum (Russian: Борис Исаакович Коренблюм; 12 August 1923, Odessa, now Ukraine – 15 December 2011, Slingerlands, New York) was a Soviet-Israeli-American mathematician, specializing in mathematical analysis.

Boris Korenblum was a child prodigy in music, languages, and mathematics. He started as a violinist at the famous School of Stolyarsky in Odessa. After he won a young mathematicians competition, the family was given an apartment in Kiev, an extraordinary event. Boris was given a mentor, a local mathematics professor, who would peremptorily supervise his course of self study. To the great chagrin of his mother, Boris decided against pursuing a music career. In June 1941, when the war began, he volunteered, not yet having reached the draft age, for the Soviet Army. Because of his fluency in German, he served in a reconnaissance unit. Some of his tasks was going to the enemy lines to capture a prisoner for interrogation. He was also the one to interpret to his commanding officers when a prisoner was taken. Once, refusing to beat a prisoner who was talking already, he quarrelled with the superior officer, and was punished by being sent to a penal battalion. There, he served with, and made fast wartime friends with, some rough characters, many of whom were discharged from penal colonies "to wash with their blood the offences against the Motherland." He later told his family that this experience, together with the inevitable maturing during a bloody war, made a man out of a soft city boy with a doting Jewish mother. After some time, the need for competent interpreters saw him return to his unit, where he served with distinction to the end of the war. His awards, including an Order of the Red Banner, were taken from him when he emigrated to Israel in November 1973.

Coming home from the war, he passed all the exams for the undergraduate degree in mathematics in a few of months, and was admitted for graduate study at the Institute of Mathematics of the National Academy of Sciences of Ukraine where he received in 1947 his Candidate of Sciences degree (PhD) under the direction of Evgeny Yakovlevich Remez.

Korenblum received his Russian Doctorate of Sciences (habilitation) from Moscow State University in 1956. Around 1952, during the height of the antisemitic campaign, he was dismissed from the Institute of Mathematics, along with all other Jewish and half-Jewish scientists. Subsequently, he became a Professor of Mathematics at the Institute of Civil Engineering, thanks to the heroic efforts of Professor Yurii D. Sokolov (1896–1971), who risked his own position in the politically charged atmosphere of the time. Boris Korenblum remained there until his emigration to Israel.

In 1958, he published a little-noticed paper outlining the basic concept and theory for computed tomography (CT) with S.I. Tetelbaum. This was five years before A.M. Cormack's seminal paper in the West, which laid the theoretical foundation for CT and earned him the Nobel Prize in Physiology or Medicine in 1979.

From 1974 to 1977 Korenblum was a professor of mathematics at Tel Aviv University. In 1977 he was at the Institute for Advanced Study in Princeton, New Jersey. He was a professor at the University at Albany, SUNY from 1977 until his retirement in 2009 as professor emeritus.

Korenblum's research dealt with classical harmonic analysis, functional analysis, Banach algebras, and complex analysis. He was an Invited Speaker at the ICM in 1978 in Helsinki. In November 2003 a conference was held in Barcelona to celebrate the occasion of his 80th birthday. He is survived by his wife, his children, and a granddaughter.

== Selected publications ==
- "About one scheme of tomography", with S.I. Tetelbaum and A. A.Tyutin, Proc. of Higher Edu. Institutions - Radiophysics 1958, Volume 1, No. 3
- “A generalization of Wiener's Tauberian theorem and harmonic analysis of rapidly increasing functions”, Proc. (Trudy) Moscow Math. Soc., 1958, v. 7, 121–148.
- “Closed ideals of ring A^{n}, Func. Anal. and Applic. (Moscow), 1972, v. 6, 38–52.
- Korenblum, Boris (1975). "An extension of the Nevanlinna theory". Acta Mathematica. 135: 187–219. doi:10.1007/BF02392019.
- Korenblum, Boris (1977). "A Beurling-type theorem". Acta Mathematica. 138: 265–293. doi:10.1007/BF02392318.
- Korenblum, Boris (1983). "Some problems in potential theory and the notion of harmonic entropy" (PDF). Bull. Amer. Math. Soc. (N.S.). 8 (3): 459–462. doi:10.1090/S0273-0979-1983-15120-0.
- Korenblum, B. (1983). "A generalization of two classical convergence tests for Fourier series, and some new Banach spaces of functions" (PDF). Bull. Amer. Math. Soc. (N.S.). 9 (2): 215–218. doi:10.1090/S0273-0979-1983-15160-1.
- with Edward Thomas: Korenblum, Boris; Thomas, Edward (1983). "An inequality with applications in potential theory". Trans. Amer. Math. Soc. 279 (2): 525–536. doi:10.1090/S0002-9947-1983-0709566-X.
- Korenblum, B. (1985). "BMO estimates and radial growth of Bloch functions". Bull. Amer. Math. Soc. (N.S.). 12: 99–102. doi:10.1090/S0273-0979-1985-15302-9.
- Korenblum, Boris (1985). "On a class of Banach spaces of functions associated with the notion of entropy". Trans. Amer. Math. Soc. 290 (2): 527–553. doi:10.1090/S0002-9947-1985-0792810-2.
- with Leon Brown: “Cyclic vectors in A^{–∞}, Proc. Amer. Math. Soc., 1987, v. 101, 137–138. doi:10.1090/S0002-9939-1988-0915731-9
- with Joaquim Bruna: Bruna, Joaquim; Korenblum, Boris (1987). "A note on Calderón-Zygmund singular integral convolution operators" (PDF). Bull. Amer. Math. Soc. (N.S.). 16 (2): 271–273. doi:10.1090/S0273-0979-1987-15515-7.
- “Transformation of zero sets by contractive operators in the Bergman space”, Bull. Sci. Math. (2), 1990, v. 114, 385–394.
- “A maximum principle for the Bergman space”, Publicacions Math., 1991, v. 35, 479–486. JSTOR 43736335
- with Kendall Richards: Korenblum, Boris; Richards, Kendall (1993). "Majorization and domination in the Bergman space". Proc. Amer. Math. Soc. 117: 153–158. doi:10.1090/S0002-9939-1993-1113643-3.
- with R. O’Neil, K. Richards, and K. Zhu: Korenblum, B.; o'Neil, R.; Richards, K.; Zhu, K. (1993). "Totally monotone functions with applications to the Bergman space". Trans. Amer. Math. Soc. 337 (2): 795–806. doi:10.1090/S0002-9947-1993-1118827-0.
- with Kehe Zhu: "An application of Tauberian theorems to Toeplitz operators." Journal of Operator Theory, 1995, 353–361. JSTOR 24714916
- with A. Mascuilli and J. Panariello: Korenblum, B.; Mascuilli, A.; Panariello, J. (1998). "A generalization of Carleman's uniqueness theorem and a discrete Phragmén-Lindelöf theorem". Proc. Amer. Math. Soc. 126 (7): 2025–2032. doi:10.1090/S0002-9939-98-04239-7.
- with Håkan Hedenmalm and Kehe Zhu: Theory of Bergman Spaces, Springer, 2000.
- with John C. Racquet: “Concurrence of Uniqueness and Boundedness Conditions for Regular Sequences”, Complex Variables, 2000, v. 41, 231–239. doi:10.1080/17476930008815251
- with Catherine Beneteau: “Jensen type inequalities and radial null sets”, Analysis, 2001, v. 21, 99–105.
- with Emmanuel Rashba: “Classical properties of low-dimensional conductors”, Phys. Rev. Lett., 2002, v. 89, no. 9. doi:10.1103/PhysRevLett.89.096803
- with C. Beneteau: “Some coefficient estimates for H^{p} functions”, Proc. of the International Conference in Karmiel (Israel), 2004.
