= Bernstein's theorem (approximation theory) =

In approximation theory, a converse to Jackson's theorem

In approximation theory, Bernstein's theorem is a converse to Jackson's theorem. The first results of this type were proved by Sergei Bernstein in 1912.

For approximation by trigonometric polynomials, the result is as follows:

Let f: [0, 2π] → ℂ be a 2 π periodic function, and assume r is a positive integer, and that 0 < α < 1 . If there exists some fixed number $~~ k( f ) > 0 ~~$ and a sequence of trigonometric polynomials $~~ \Bigl(\ P_{n_0}(x)\ ,\ P_{n_0 + 1}(x)\ ,\ P_{n_0 + 2}(x)\ ,\ \ldots \Bigr) ~~$ for which $~~ \deg P_n = n ~~$ and $~~ \sup_{0 \leq x \leq 2\pi} \Bigl|f(x) - P_n(x)\Bigr| \leq \frac{\ k(f)\ }{~~ n^{r + \alpha}\ }\ ,$ for every $\ n \ge n_0\ ,$ then f(x) = P_{n_{0}}(x) + φ(x) , where the function φ(x) has a bounded r th derivative which is α-Hölder continuous.

== See also ==
- Bernstein's lethargy theorem
- Constructive function theory
