= Sally Elizabeth Carlson =

American mathematician

- Born: October 2, 1896; Minneapolis, Minnesota
- Died: November 1, 2000 (aged 104); Minneapolis, Minnesota

Academic background
- Education: University of Minnesota
- Thesis: The Convergence of Certain Methods of Closest Approximation (1924)
- Doctoral advisor: Dunham Jackson

Academic work
- Discipline: Mathematics
- Sub-discipline: Functional analysis
- Institutions: University of Minnesota
- Notable students: Margaret P. Martin

Sally Elizabeth Carlson (October 2, 1896 – November 1, 2000) was an American mathematician, the first woman and one of the first two people to obtain a doctorate in mathematics from the University of Minnesota.

== Early life and education ==
Carlson was born in Minneapolis to a large working-class family of Swedish immigrants. She became her high school valedictorian in 1913, graduated from the University of Minnesota in 1917, and earned a master's degree there in 1918. After teaching mathematics for two years, she returned to graduate study in 1920, and completed her Ph.D. at Minnesota in 1924. Both students were supervised by Dunham Jackson; Carlson's dissertation, in functional analysis, was On The Convergence of Certain Methods of Closest Approximation.

== Career and contributions ==
She joined the Minnesota faculty, and remained there until her retirement in 1965 as a full professor. She has no record of supervising doctoral dissertations, and published little research after the work of her own dissertation. However, she supervised several master's students, and was described as a mentor by Margaret P. Martin, who completed her Ph.D. at Minnesota in 1944.

== Recognition ==
Carlson won a Distinguished Teacher Award at Minnesota. After her death at a nursing home in Minneapolis on November 1, 2000, at the age of 104, the library of the University of Minnesota memorialized her in an exhibit titled Elizabeth Carlson, notable alumna.
