= Gregory Beylkin =

Russian-American mathematician

Gregory Beylkin (born 16 March 1953) is a Russian–American mathematician.

== Education and career ==
He studied from 1970 to 1975 at the University of Leningrad, with Diploma in Mathematics in November 1975. From 1976 to 1979 he was a research scientist at the Research Institute of Ore Geophysics, Leningrad. From 1980 to 1982 he was a graduate student at New York University, where he received his PhD under the supervision of Peter Lax. From 1982 to 1983 Beylkin was an associate research scientist at the Courant Institute of Mathematical Sciences. From 1983 to 1991 he was a member of the professional staff of Schlumberger-Doll Research in Ridgefield, Connecticut. Since 1991 he has been a professor in the Department of Applied Mathematics at the University of Colorado Boulder. He was a visiting professor at Yale University, the University of Minnesota, and the Mittag-Leffler Institute and participated in 2012 and 2015 in the summer seminar on "Applied Harmonic Analysis and Sparse Approximation" at Oberwolfach. He is the author or co-author of over 100 articles in refereed journal and has served on several editorial boards.

Gregory Beylkin's research is focused on analysis and development of fast algorithms for solving integral and differential equations. Applications include quantum chemistry, gravity field evaluation and estimation, wave propagation and inverse problems. A number of algorithms developed by Gregory Beylkin and his group have been implemented and are used in practical applications.

== Awards and honors ==
- 1998 — Invited Speaker of the International Congress of Mathematicians
- 2012 — Fellow of the American Mathematical Society
- 2016 — Fellow of the Society for Industrial and Applied Mathematics

== Patents ==
- Beylkin, Gregory (July 26, 1988). "Seismic exploration using exactly invertible discrete transformation into tau-p space, U.S. Patent 4,760,563".
- Beylkin, Gregory (September 13, 2007). "Method and Apparatus for Efficient Data Acquisition and Interpolation, U.S. Patent 20070214202A1".

== See also ==
- Fast wavelet transform § Further reading
