= Burton Wendroff =

American mathematician

- Born: 10 March 1930 (age 96)
- Education: New York University; Massachusetts Institute of Technology
- Known for: Hyperbolic conservation laws Lax–Wendroff method
- Scientific career
- Fields: Applied Mathematics
- Workplaces: Los Alamos National Laboratory; University of Denver; University of New Mexico
- Doctoral advisor: Peter Lax

Burton Wendroff (born March 10, 1930) is an American applied mathematician known for his contributions to the development of numerical methods for the solution of hyperbolic partial differential equations. The Lax–Wendroff method for the solution of hyperbolic PDE is named for Wendroff (as well as for Peter Lax).

Wendroff is an adjunct professor at the Department of Mathematics and Statistics, University of New Mexico. He is also a retired fellow and associate at the Los Alamos National Laboratory.

Wendroff is a primary author of the chess program Lachex. Together with co-author Tony Warnock, Lachex competed at two World Computer Chess Championships at Cologne (1986) and Madrid (1992).

== Career and research ==
Wendroff received his B.A. degree in mathematics and physics from the New York University in 1951 and M.S. degree in mathematics from the Massachusetts Institute of Technology in 1952. After his M.S., Burt joined Los Alamos National Laboratory as a staff member. While at Los Alamos, he went to New York University to do his Ph.D. and received the degree under the supervision of Peter Lax in 1958. The title of his Ph.D. thesis was "Finite Difference Approximations to the Solutions of Partial Differential Equations". During 1966 to 1973, he served as a professor at the University of Denver.

His primary area of research involves the development of numerical schemes for hyperbolic partial differential equations using finite difference method. Together with Peter Lax, he has developed the now classical Lax–Wendroff method. He has developed two-dimensional HLLE Riemann solver and associated Godunov-type difference scheme for gas dynamics problems. Wendroff has also made contribution to the early development of convergence study of finite element method.

== Awards and honors ==
Wendroff was elected as SIAM Fellow of Society for Industrial and Applied Mathematics for his "contributions to the numerical solution of partial differential equations".

== Selected publications ==
Books

- Theoretical Numerical Analysis, Academic Press, 1966.
- The Theory and Practice of Computation, Addison-Wesley, 1966.

Articles

- Lax, Peter; Wendroff, Burton (1960). "Systems of Conservation Laws". Comm. Pure Appl. Math. 13 (2). Springer: 217–237. doi:10.1002/cpa.3160130205.
- Lax, Peter D.; Wendroff, Burton (1964). "Difference Schemes for Hyperbolic Equations with High Order of Accuracy". Comm. Pure Appl. Math. 17 (3). Springer: 381–398. doi:10.1002/cpa.3160170311.
- Stewart, H.B.; Wendroff, B. (1984). "Two-phase flow: models and methods". J. Comput. Phys. 56 (3). Academic Press: 363–409. Bibcode:1984JCoPh..56..363S. doi:10.1016/0021-9991(84)90103-7. OSTI 6253509.
- Liska, Richard; Wendroff, Burton (1998). "Composite Schemes for Conservation Laws". SIAM J. Numer. Anal. 35 (6). SIAM: 2250–2271. doi:10.1137/s0036142996310976. JSTOR 2587257.
- Wendroff, Burton (1972). "The Riemann problem for materials with nonconvex equations of state I: Isentropic flow". J. Math. Anal. Appl. 38 (2). Elsevier: 454–466. doi:10.1016/0022-247X(72)90103-5.
- Swartz, Blair; Wendroff, Burton (1969). "Generalized Finite-Difference Schemes". Math. Comput. 23 (105). American Mathematical Society: 37–49. doi:10.1090/s0025-5718-1969-0239768-7. JSTOR 2005052.
- Thomee, Vidar; Wendroff, Burton (1974). "Convergence estimates for Galerkin methods for variable coefficient initial value problems". SIAM Journal on Numerical Analysis. 11 (5). SIAM: 1059–1068. Bibcode:1974SJNA...11.1059T. doi:10.1137/0711081. JSTOR 2156042.
