= Jackson's inequality =

Inequality on approximations of a function by algebraic or trigonometric polynomials

In approximation theory, Jackson's inequality is an inequality bounding the value of function's best approximation by algebraic or trigonometric polynomials in terms of the modulus of continuity or modulus of smoothness of the function or of its derivatives. Informally speaking, the smoother the function is, the better it can be approximated by polynomials.

== Statement: trigonometric polynomials ==
For trigonometric polynomials, the following was proved by Dunham Jackson:

Theorem 1: If $f:[0,2\pi]\to \C$ is an $r$ times differentiable periodic function such that

$$\left |f^{(r)}(x) \right | \leq 1, \qquad x\in[0,2\pi],$$

then, for every positive integer $n$, there exists a trigonometric polynomial $T_{n-1}$ of degree at most $n-1$ such that

$$\left |f(x) - T_{n-1}(x) \right | \leq \frac{C(r)}{n^r}, \qquad x\in[0,2\pi],$$

where $C(r)$ depends only on $r$.

The Akhiezer–Krein–Favard theorem gives the sharp value of $C(r)$ (called the Akhiezer–Krein–Favard constant):

$$C(r) = \frac{4}{\pi} \sum_{k=0}^\infty \left[\frac{(-1)^k}{2k+1}\right]^{r+1}~.$$

Jackson also proved the following generalisation of Theorem 1:

Theorem 2: One can find a trigonometric polynomial $T_n$ of degree $\le n$ such that

$$|f(x) - T_n(x)| \leq \frac{C(r) \omega \left (\frac{1}{n}, f^{(r)} \right )}{n^r}, \qquad x\in[0,2\pi],$$

where $\omega(\delta, g)$ denotes the modulus of continuity of function $g$ with the step $\delta.$

An even more general result of four authors can be formulated as the following Jackson theorem.

Theorem 3: For every natural number $n$, if $f$ is $2\pi$-periodic continuous function, there exists a trigonometric polynomial $T_n$ of degree $\le n$ such that

$$|f(x)-T_n(x)|\leq c(k)\omega_k\left(\tfrac{1}{n},f\right),\qquad x\in[0,2\pi],$$

where constant $c(k)$ depends on $k\in\N,$ and $\omega_k$ is the $k$-th order modulus of smoothness.

For $k=1$ this result was proved by Dunham Jackson. Antoni Zygmund proved the inequality in the case when $k=2, \omega_2(t,f)\le ct, t>0$ in 1945. Naum Akhiezer proved the theorem in the case $k=2$ in 1956. For $k>2$ this result was established by Sergey Stechkin in 1967.

== Further remarks ==
Generalisations and extensions are called Jackson-type theorems. A converse to Jackson's inequality is given by Bernstein's theorem. See also constructive function theory.
