= Flux-corrected transport =

Numerical technique for solving hyperbolic equations

Flux-corrected transport (FCT) is a conservative shock-capturing scheme for solving Euler equations and other hyperbolic equations which occur in gas dynamics, aerodynamics, and magnetohydrodynamics. It is especially useful for solving problems involving shock or contact discontinuities. An FCT algorithm consists of two stages, a transport stage and a flux-corrected anti-diffusion stage. The numerical errors introduced in the first stage (i.e., the transport stage) are corrected in the anti-diffusion stage.

== See also ==
- Computational fluid dynamics
- Computational magnetohydrodynamics
- Shock capturing methods
- Volume of fluid method
- Advection scheme
