= Journal of Approximation Theory =

- Discipline: Approximation theory
- Language: English
- Edited by: Paul Nevai and Amos Ron

Publication details
- History: 1968 to present
- Publisher: Elsevier (U.S.)
- Impact factor: 1.091 (2020)

Standard abbreviations
- ISO 4: J. Approx. Theory

Indexing
- CODEN: JAXTAZ
- ISSN: 0021-9045

Links
- Journal homepage

The Journal of Approximation Theory is "devoted to advances in pure and applied approximation theory and related areas."

It was founded in 1968. In 2001, it was purchased from its previous publisher, Academic Press, by Elsevier. In 2026, its editorial board resigned en masse over the publisher's oversight of its editorial decisions, writing that "the journal as we have known it has effectively ceased to exist".
