= Evgeny Yakovlevich Remez =

Soviet mathematician

Evgeny Yakovlevich Remez (sometimes spelled as Evgenii Yakovlevich Remez, Russian: Евге́ний Я́ковлевич Ре́мез; 1895 in Mstislavl, now Belarus – 1975 in Kyiv, now Ukraine) was a Soviet mathematician. He is known for his work in the constructive function theory, in particular, for the Remez algorithm and the Remez inequality.

His doctoral students include Boris Korenblum.
