= Peter Lax =

Hungarian-born American mathematician (1926–2025)

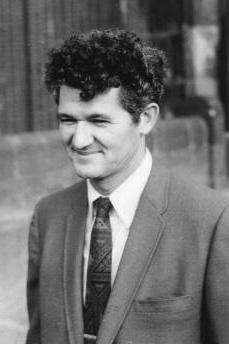
- Lax in Tokyo in 1969
- Born: Péter Dávid Lax; 1 May 1926; Budapest, Hungary
- Died: 16 May 2025 (aged 99); New York City, U.S.
- Education: New York University (BS, MS, PhD); Texas A&M University; University of New Mexico; Stanford University
- Known for: Lax equivalence theorem; Lax pairs; Lax–Milgram theorem; Lax–Friedrichs method; Lax–Wendroff method; Lax–Wendroff theorem; Beurling–Lax theorem; HLLE solver; Fourier integral operator
- Awards: Lester R. Ford (1966); John von Neumann Prize (1968); Chauvenet Prize (1974); Norbert Wiener Prize (1975); National Medal of Science (1986); Wolf Prize (1987); Abel Prize (2005); Lomonosov Gold Medal (2013)
- Scientific career
- Fields: Mathematics
- Workplaces: Courant Institute
- Thesis: Nonlinear System of Hyperbolic Partial Differential Equations in Two Independent Variables (1949)
- Doctoral advisor: K. O. Friedrichs
- Doctoral students: Steve Alpern; Chen Li-an; Gregory Beylkin; Alexandre Chorin; Charles Epstein; Michael Ghil; Ami Harten; James (Mac) Hyman; George Logemann; Jeffrey Rauch; Burton Wendroff

Peter David Lax (1 May 1926 – 16 May 2025) was a Hungarian-born American mathematician and Abel Prize laureate working in the areas of pure and applied mathematics.

Lax made important contributions to integrable systems, fluid dynamics and shock waves, solitonic physics, hyperbolic conservation laws, and mathematical and scientific computing, among other fields. In a 1958 paper Lax stated a conjecture about matrix representations for third-order hyperbolic polynomials which remained unproven for over four decades. Interest in the "Lax conjecture" grew as mathematicians working in several different areas recognized the importance of its implications in their field, until it was finally proven to be true in 2003.

== Personal life and education ==
Lax was born on 1 May 1926 in Budapest, Hungary, to a Jewish family. He began displaying an interest in mathematics at age twelve, and soon his parents hired Rózsa Péter as a tutor for him. His parents Klara Kornfield and Henry Lax were both physicians and his uncle Albert Kornfeld (also known as Albert Korodi) was a mathematician, as well as a friend of Leó Szilárd. The family left Hungary on 15 November 1941 during World War II, and traveled via Lisbon to the United States.

As a student at Stuyvesant High School, Lax took no math classes but did compete on the school math team. During this time, he met with John von Neumann, Richard Courant, and Paul Erdős, who introduced him to Albert Einstein. As he was still 17 when he finished high school, he could avoid military service, and was able to study for three semesters at New York University. He attended a complex analysis class in the role of a student, but ended up taking over as instructor. He met his future wife, Anneli Cahn (married to her first husband at that time) in this class.

Before being able to complete his studies, Lax was drafted into the U.S. Army. After basic training, the Army sent him to Texas A&M University for more studies. He was then sent to Oak Ridge National Laboratory, and soon afterwards to the Manhattan Project at Los Alamos, New Mexico. At Los Alamos, he began working as a calculator operator, but eventually moved on to higher-level mathematics.

After the war ended, Lax remained with the Army at Los Alamos for another year, while taking courses at the University of New Mexico, then studied at Stanford University for a semester with Gábor Szegő and George Pólya. Lax returned to NYU for the 1946–1947 academic year, and by pooling credits from the four universities at which he had studied, he graduated that year. He stayed at NYU for his graduate studies, marrying Anneli in 1948 and earning a PhD in 1949 under the supervision of Kurt O. Friedrichs. After Anneli's death in 1999, Lax married Courant's daughter, Lori Berkowitz.

== Career ==
In 1954, the U.S. Atomic Energy Commission put Lax and several of his colleagues at NYU in charge of using an early supercomputer to calculate the risk of flooding for a major nuclear reactor if a nearby dam were sabotaged; they concluded that the reactor would be safe.

Lax made contributions to the theory of hyperbolic partial differential equations. He made breakthroughs in understanding shock waves from bombs, weather prediction and aerodynamic design.

Concepts that bear Lax's name include the Lax equivalence theorem, which explained when numerical computer approximations would be reliable, and Lax pairs, which are helpful in understanding the motion of solitons. With Ralph Phillips, Lax developed the Lax-Phillips semigroup in scattering theory, which explained how waves move around obstacles and showed how to use the pattern of a wave's frequencies to understand its motion. That theory is helpful in processing radar signals.

Lax held a faculty position in the Department of Mathematics, Courant Institute of Mathematical Sciences, New York University. Beginning in 1963, Dr. Lax directed the Courant Institute's computing facilities.

Lax died of cardiac amyloidosis at his Manhattan home, on 16 May 2025, at the age of 99.

== Awards and honors ==
He was a member of the Norwegian Academy of Science and Letters and the National Academy of Sciences, USA, the American Academy of Arts and Sciences, and the American Philosophical Society. He won a Lester R. Ford Award in 1966 and again in 1973. In 1974, his shock wave article also won the Chauvenet Prize. He was awarded the National Medal of Science in 1986, the Wolf Prize in 1987, the Abel Prize in 2005 and the Lomonosov Gold Medal in 2013. The American Mathematical Society selected him as its Gibbs Lecturer for 2007. In 2012, he became a fellow of the American Mathematical Society.

Lax is listed as an ISI highly cited researcher. According to György Marx, he was one of the Hungarian-American scientists known as The Martians.

Lax also received an Honorary Doctorate from Heriot-Watt University in 1990.

== The CDC 6600 incident ==
In 1970, as part of an anti-war protest, the Transcendental Students took hostage a CDC 6600 super computer at NYU's Courant Institute which Lax had been instrumental in acquiring; the students demanded $100,000 in ransom (equivalent to $830,000 in 2025) to provide bail for a member of the Black Panthers. Some of the students present attempted to destroy the computer with incendiary devices, but Lax and colleagues managed to disable the devices and save the machine.

== Books ==
- Lax, Peter D.; Maria Shea, Terrell (2014). Calculus With Applications. Undergraduate Texts in Mathematics (2nd ed.). Springer New York, NY. doi:10.1007/978-1-4614-7946-8. ISBN 978-1-4614-7945-1.
- ——; Maria Shea, Terrell (2017). Multivariable Calculus with Applications. Undergraduate Texts in Mathematics (1st ed.). Springer New York, NY. doi:10.1007/978-3-319-74073-7. ISBN 978-3-319-74072-0.
- ——; Terrell, Maria Shea (21 September 2013). Calculus With Applications. New York, NY: Springer. ISBN 978-1-4614-7945-1.
- ——; Zalcman, Lawrence (21 December 2011). Complex Proofs of Real Theorems. Providence, R.I: American Mathematical Soc. ISBN 978-0-8218-7559-9.
- Decay of Solutions of Systems of Nonlinear Hyperbolic Conservation Laws, with J. Glimm, American Mathematical Society (1970).
- —— (4 April 2002). Functional Analysis. New York: John Wiley & Sons. ISBN 978-0-471-55604-6. (Review)
- —— (2006). Hyperbolic Partial Differential Equations. New York: American Mathematical Soc. ISBN 978-0-8218-3576-0.
- —— (1 January 1973). Hyperbolic Systems of Conservation Laws and the Mathematical Theory of Shock Waves. Philadelphia, Pa: SIAM. ISBN 978-0-89871-177-6.
- —— (10 September 2007). Linear Algebra and Its Applications. Hoboken, N.J: John Wiley & Sons. ISBN 978-0-471-75156-4.
- —— (1977). Mathematical Aspects of Production and Distribution of Energy. Providence: American Mathematical Soc. ISBN 978-0-8218-0121-5.
- Fujita, H.; ——; Strang, G. (1 April 2000). Nonlinear Partial Differential Equations in Applied Science. Amsterdam: Elsevier. ISBN 978-0-08-087192-9.
- ——; Nirenberg, L.; Spigler, Renato (1998). Recent Advances in Partial Differential Equations, Venice 1996. Providence, R.I: American Mathematical Soc. ISBN 978-0-8218-0657-9.
- Boillat, Guy; Dafermos, Constantin M.; ——; Liu, Tai-Ping (14 November 2006). Recent Mathematical Methods in Nonlinear Wave Propagation. Berlin, Heidelberg: Springer. ISBN 978-3-540-49565-9.
- ——; Phillips, Ralph S. (1989). Scattering Theory, Revised Edition. Boston San Diego New York [etc.]: Academic Press. ISBN 0-12-440051-5.
- ——; Phillips, Ralph S. (1976). Scattering Theory for Automorphic Functions. Princeton, NJ: Princeton University Press. ISBN 978-0-691-08184-7.
- —— (2005). Selected papers. Vol. I. Berlin, New York: Springer-Verlag. ISBN 978-0-387-22925-6. MR 2164867.
- —— (2005). Selected papers. Vol. II. Berlin, New York: Springer-Verlag. ISBN 978-0-387-22926-3. MR 2164868.

== See also ==
- Babuška–Lax–Milgram theorem
- Lions–Lax–Milgram theorem
