= Constructive Approximation =

- Discipline: mathematics
- Language: English

Publication details
- History: 1985–present
- Publisher: Springer (U.S.)

Standard abbreviations
- ISO 4: Constr. Approx.

Indexing
- ISSN: 0176-4276 (print); 1432-0940 (web)

Links
- Journal homepage

Constructive Approximation is "an international mathematics journal dedicated to Approximations, expansions, and related research in: computation, function theory, functional analysis, interpolation spaces and interpolation of operators, numerical analysis, space of functions, special functions, and applications."
