= East Journal on Approximations =

- Discipline: mathematics
- Language: English

Publication details
- History: 1995 to present
- Publisher: DARBA (Bulgaria)

Standard abbreviations
- ISO 4: East J. Approx.

Indexing
- ISSN: 1310-6236

Links
- Journal homepage

The East Journal on Approximations is a journal about approximation theory published in Sofia, Bulgaria.
