= Jeffrey Rauch =

American mathematician

Jeffrey B. Rauch (born 29 November 1945, New York City) is an American mathematical physicist, specializing in partial differential equations.

Rauch obtained his bachelor's degree from Harvard University in 1967, and his Ph.D. from New York University in 1971 (with Peter Lax as advisor).

He is a fellow of the American Mathematical Society.

He is also an author of textbooks.
