= Bernstein–von Mises theorem =

Results about asymptotic posterior normality

In Bayesian inference, the Bernstein–von Mises theorem provides the basis for using Bayesian credible sets for confidence statements in parametric models. It states that under some conditions, a posterior distribution converges in total variation distance to a multivariate normal distribution centered at the maximum likelihood estimator $\widehat{\theta}_n$ with covariance matrix given by $n^{-1}\mathcal{I}(\theta_0)^{-1}$, where $\theta_0$ is the true population parameter and $\mathcal{I}(\theta_0)$ is the Fisher information matrix at the true population parameter value:

$$||P(\theta|x_1,\dots x_n) - \mathcal{N}({\widehat{\theta}}_n, n^{-1}\mathcal{I}(\theta_0)^{-1})||_{{\mathrm{TV}}} \xrightarrow{P_{\theta_0}} = 0$$

The Bernstein–von Mises theorem links Bayesian inference with frequentist inference. It assumes there is some true probabilistic process that generates the observations, as in frequentism, and then studies the quality of Bayesian methods of recovering that process, and making uncertainty statements about that process. In particular, it states that asymptotically, many Bayesian credible sets of a certain credibility level $\alpha$ will act as confidence sets of confidence level $\alpha$, which allows for the interpretation of Bayesian credible sets in frequentist terms.

== Statement ==
Let $(P_\theta\,:\,\theta\in\Theta)$ be a well-specified statistical model, where the parameter space $\Theta$ is a subset of $\mathbb{R}^k$. Further, let data $X_1, \ldots, X_n \in \mathcal{X}$ be independently and identically distributed from $P_{\theta_0}$. Suppose that all of the following conditions hold:

1. The model admits densities $(p_\theta\,:\,\theta\in\Theta)$ with respect to some measure $\mu$.
2. The Fisher information matrix $\mathcal{I}(\theta_0)$ is nonsingular.
3. The model is differentiable in quadratic mean. That is, there exists a measurable function $f:\mathcal{X}\rightarrow\mathbb{R}^k$ such that$\int\left[\sqrt{p_\theta(x)} - \sqrt{p_{\theta_0}(x)}- \frac{1}{2}(\theta - \theta_0)^\top f(x)\sqrt{p_{\theta_0}(x)}\right]^2 \mathrm{d}\mu(x) = o(||\theta - \theta_0||^2)$ as $\theta \rightarrow \theta_0$.
4. For every $\varepsilon > 0$, there exists a sequence of test functions $\phi_n:\mathcal{X}^n \rightarrow [0, 1]$ such that $\mathbb{E}_{\mathbf{X} \sim P^n_{\theta_0}}\left[\phi_n(\mathbf{X})\right] \rightarrow 0$ and $\sup_{\theta \,:\, ||\theta-\theta_0||>\varepsilon} \mathbb{E}_{\mathbf{X}\sim P^n_{\theta}}\left[1 - \phi_n(\mathbf{X})\right] \rightarrow 0$ as $n \rightarrow \infty$.
5. The prior measure is absolutely continuous with respect to the Lebesgue measure in a neighborhood of $\theta_0$, with a continuous positive density at $\theta_0$.

Then for any estimator $\widehat{\theta}_n$ satisfying $\sqrt{n}( {\widehat{\theta}}_n - \theta_0) \xrightarrow{d} \mathcal{N}(0, {\mathcal{I}}^{-1}(\theta_0))$, the posterior distribution $\Pi_n$ of $\theta\mid X_1, \ldots, X_n$ satisfies

${\left|\left|\Pi_n - \mathcal{N}\left(\widehat{\theta}_n, \frac{1}{n}{\mathcal{I}}^{-1}({\theta_0})\right)\right|\right|}_{\mathrm{TV}} \xrightarrow{P_{\theta_0}} 0.$

as $n\rightarrow \infty$.

== Relationship to maximum likelihood estimation ==
Under certain regularity conditions, the maximum likelihood estimator is an asymptotically efficient estimator and can thus be used as $\widehat{\theta}_n$ in the theorem statement. This then yields that the posterior distribution converges in total variation distance to the asymptotic distribution of the maximum likelihood estimator, which is commonly used to construct frequentist confidence sets.

== Implications ==
The most important implication of the Bernstein–von Mises theorem is that the Bayesian inference is asymptotically correct from a frequentist point of view. This means that for large amounts of data, one can use the posterior distribution to make, from a frequentist point of view, valid statements about estimation and uncertainty.

== History ==
The theorem is named after Richard von Mises and S. N. Bernstein, although the first proper proof was given by Joseph L. Doob in 1949 for random variables with finite probability space. Later Lucien Le Cam, his PhD student Lorraine Schwartz, David A. Freedman and Persi Diaconis extended the proof under more general assumptions.

== Limitations ==
In case of a misspecified model, the posterior distribution will also become asymptotically Gaussian with a correct mean, but not necessarily with the Fisher information as the variance. This implies that Bayesian credible sets of level $\alpha$ cannot be interpreted as confidence sets of level $\alpha$.

In the case of nonparametric statistics, the Bernstein–von Mises theorem usually fails to hold with a notable exception of the Dirichlet process.

A remarkable result was found by Freedman in 1965: the Bernstein–von Mises theorem does not hold almost surely if the random variable has an infinite countable probability space; however, this depends on allowing a very broad range of possible priors. In practice, the priors used typically in research do have the desirable property even with an infinite countable probability space.

Different summary statistics such as the mode and mean may behave differently in the posterior distribution. In Freedman's examples, the posterior density and its mean can converge on the wrong result, but the posterior mode is consistent and will converge on the correct result.
