= Lax–Wendroff method =

Numerical methods for partial differential equations

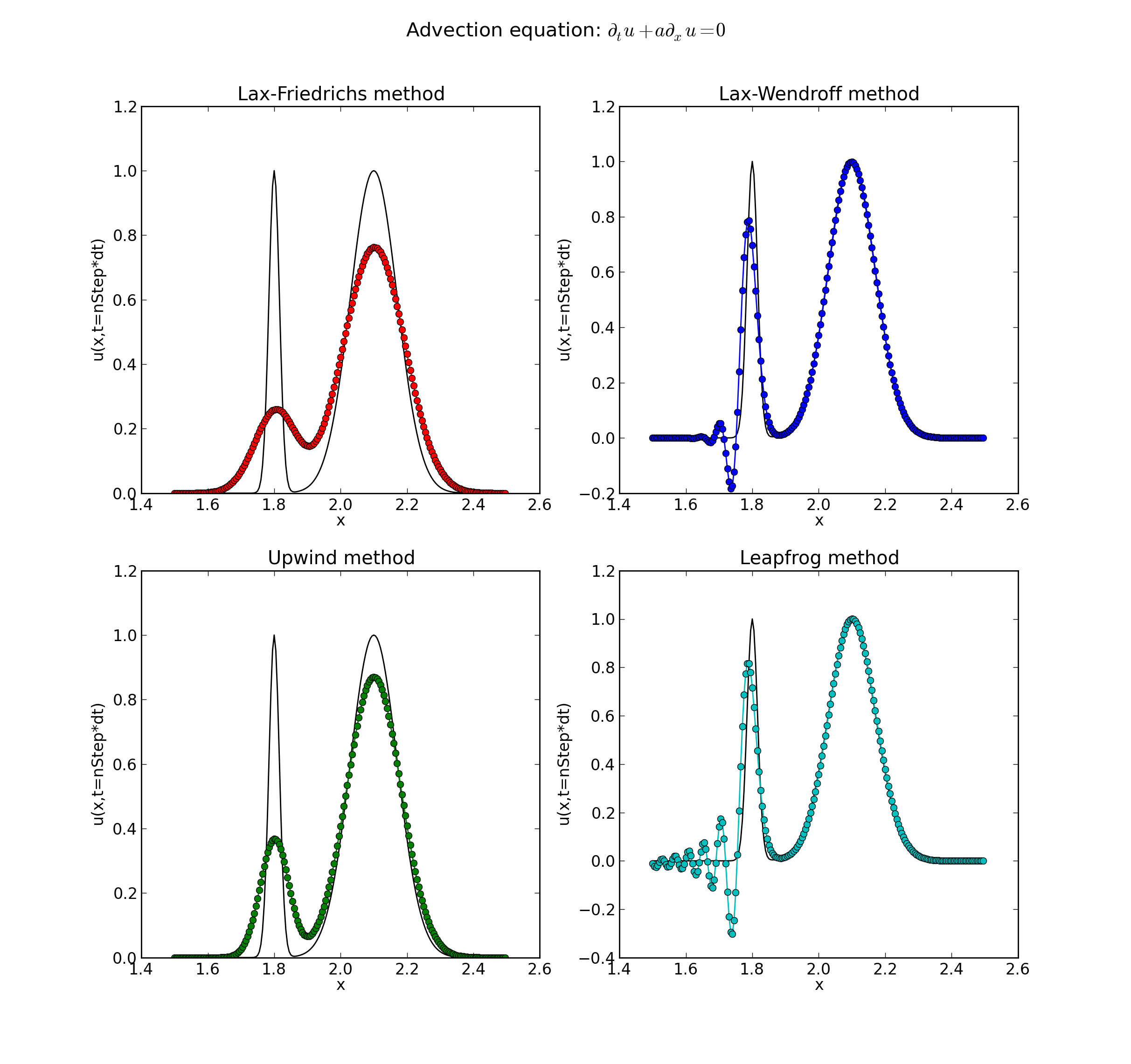
Graphs that show different Lax–Wendroff methods

The Lax–Wendroff method, named after Peter Lax and Burton Wendroff, is a numerical method for the solution of hyperbolic partial differential equations, based on finite differences. It is second-order accurate in both space and time. This method is an example of explicit time integration where the function that defines the governing equation is evaluated at the current time.

== Definition ==
Suppose one has an equation of the following form:
$$\frac{\partial u(x,t)}{\partial t} + \frac{\partial f(u(x,t))}{\partial x} = 0$$
where x and t are independent variables, and the initial state, u(x, 0) is given.

=== Linear case ===
In the linear case, where f(u) = Au, and A is a constant,
$$u_i^{n+1} = u_i^n - \frac{\Delta t}{2\Delta x} A\left[ u_{i+1}^{n} - u_{i-1}^{n} \right] + \frac{\Delta t^2}{2\Delta x^2} A^2\left[ u_{i+1}^{n} -2 u_{i}^{n} + u_{i-1}^{n} \right].$$
Here $n$ refers to the $t$ dimension and $i$ refers to the $x$ dimension. This linear scheme can be extended to the general non-linear case in different ways. One of them is letting
$$A(u) = f'(u) = \frac{\partial f}{\partial u}$$

=== Non-linear case ===
The conservative form of Lax-Wendroff for a general non-linear equation is then:
$$u_i^{n+1} = u_i^n - \frac{\Delta t}{2\Delta x} \left[ f(u_{i+1}^{n}) - f(u_{i-1}^{n}) \right] + \frac{\Delta t^2}{2\Delta x^2} \left[ A_{i+1/2} \left(f(u_{i+1}^{n}) - f(u_{i}^{n})\right) - A_{i-1/2}\left( f(u_{i}^{n})-f(u_{i-1}^{n})\right) \right].$$
where $A_{i\pm 1/2}$ is the Jacobian matrix evaluated at $\frac{1}{2} (u^n_i + u^n_{i\pm 1})$.

== Jacobian free methods ==
To avoid the Jacobian evaluation, use a two-step procedure.

=== Richtmyer method ===
What follows is the Richtmyer two-step Lax–Wendroff method. The first step in the Richtmyer two-step Lax–Wendroff method calculates values for f(u(x, t)) at half time steps, t_{n + 1/2} and half grid points, x_{i + 1/2}. In the second step values at t_{n + 1} are calculated using the data for t_{n} and t_{n + 1/2}.

First (Lax) steps:
$$u_{i+1/2}^{n+1/2} = \frac{1}{2}(u_{i+1}^n + u_{i}^n) - \frac{\Delta t}{2\,\Delta x}( f(u_{i+1}^n) - f(u_{i}^n) ),$$
$$u_{i-1/2}^{n+1/2}= \frac{1}{2}(u_{i}^n + u_{i-1}^n) - \frac{\Delta t}{2\,\Delta x}( f(u_{i}^n) - f(u_{i-1}^n) ).$$

Second step:
$$u_i^{n+1} = u_i^n - \frac{\Delta t}{\Delta x} \left[ f(u_{i+1/2}^{n+1/2}) - f(u_{i-1/2}^{n+1/2}) \right].$$

=== MacCormack method ===
Another method of this same type was proposed by MacCormack. MacCormack's method uses first forward differencing and then backward differencing:

First step:
$$u_{i}^{*}= u_{i}^n - \frac{\Delta t}{\Delta x}( f(u_{i+1}^n) - f(u_{i}^n) ).$$
Second step:
$$u_i^{n+1} = \frac{1}{2} (u_{i}^n + u_{i}^*) - \frac{\Delta t}{2 \Delta x} \left[ f(u_{i}^{*}) - f(u_{i-1}^{*}) \right].$$

Alternatively, First step:
$$u_{i}^{*} = u_{i}^n - \frac{\Delta t}{\Delta x}( f(u_{i}^n) - f(u_{i-1}^n)  ).$$
Second step:
$$u_i^{n+1} = \frac{1}{2} (u_{i}^n + u_{i}^*) - \frac{\Delta t}{2 \Delta x} \left[ f(u_{i+1}^{*}) - f(u_{i}^{*}) \right].$$
