= Remez inequality =

In mathematics, the Remez inequality, discovered by the Soviet mathematician Evgeny Yakovlevich Remez (Remez 1936), gives a bound on the sup norms of certain polynomials, the bound being attained by the Chebyshev polynomials.

== The inequality ==
Let σ be an arbitrary fixed positive number. Define the class of polynomials π_{n}(σ) to be those polynomials p of degree n for which

$$|p(x)| \le 1$$

on some set of measure ≥ 2 contained in the closed interval [−1, 1+σ]. Then the Remez inequality states that

$$\sup_{p \in \pi_n(\sigma)} \left\|p\right\|_\infty = \left\|T_n\right\|_\infty$$

where T_{n}(x) is the Chebyshev polynomial of degree n, and the supremum norm is taken over the interval [−1, 1+σ].

Observe that T_{n} is increasing on $[1, +\infty]$, hence

$$\|T_n\|_\infty = T_n(1+\sigma).$$

The R.i., combined with an estimate on Chebyshev polynomials, implies the following corollary: If J ⊂ R is a finite interval, and E ⊂ J is an arbitrary measurable set, then

$\max_{x \in J} |p(x)| \leq \left( \frac{4 \,\, \operatorname{mes}J}{\operatorname{mes}E} \right)^n \sup_{x \in E} |p(x)|$	⁎

for any polynomial p of degree n.

== Extensions: Nazarov–Turán lemma ==
Inequalities similar to (⁎) have been proved for different classes of functions, and are known as Remez-type inequalities. One important example is Nazarov's inequality for exponential sums (Nazarov 1993):

Nazarov's inequality. Let

$$p(x) = \sum_{k=1}^n a_k e^{\lambda_k x}$$

be an exponential sum (with arbitrary λ_{k} ∈C), and let J ⊂ R be a finite interval, E ⊂ J—an arbitrary measurable set. Then

$$\max_{x \in J} |p(x)| \leq e^{\max_k |\Re \lambda_k| \, \operatorname{mes}J} \left( \frac{C \,\, \operatorname{mes}J}{\operatorname{mes}E} \right)^{n-1} \sup_{x \in E} |p(x)|~,$$

where C > 0 is a numerical constant.

In the special case when λ_{k} are pure imaginary and integer, and the subset E is itself an interval, the inequality was proved by Pál Turán and is known as Turán's lemma.

This inequality also extends to $L^p(\mathbb{T}),\ 0\leq p\leq2$ in the following way

$$\|p\|_{L^p(\mathbb{T})} \leq e^{A(n-1) \operatorname{mes}(\mathbb{T} \setminus E)} \|p\|_{L^p(E)}$$

for some A > 0 independent of p, E, and n. When

$$\operatorname{mes} E <1-\frac{\log n}{n}$$

a similar inequality holds for p > 2. For p = ∞ there is an extension to multidimensional polynomials.

Proof: Applying Nazarov's lemma to $E = E_\lambda = \{x : |p(x)|\leq\lambda\},\ \lambda>0$ leads to

$$\max_{x \in J} |p(x)| \leq e^{\max_k |\Re \lambda_k| \, \operatorname{mes} J} \left( \frac{C \,\, \operatorname{mes} J}{\operatorname{mes} E_\lambda} \right)^{n-1} \sup_{x \in E_\lambda} |p(x)| \leq e^{\max_k |\Re \lambda_k| \, \operatorname{mes} J} \left( \frac{C \,\, \operatorname{mes} J}{\operatorname{mes} E_\lambda} \right)^{n-1} \lambda$$

thus

$$\operatorname{mes} E_\lambda \leq C \,\, \operatorname{mes} J\left(\frac{\lambda e^{\max_k |\Re \lambda_k| \, \operatorname{mes}J}}{\max_{x \in J} |p(x)|} \right)^{\frac{1}{n-1}}$$

Now fix a set $E$ and choose $\lambda$ such that $\operatorname{mes} E_\lambda\leq\tfrac{1}{2}\operatorname{mes}E$, that is

$$\lambda = \left(\frac{\operatorname{mes} E}{2C \operatorname{mes}J}\right)^{n-1}e^{-\max_k |\Re \lambda_k| \, \operatorname{mes}J}\max_{x \in J} |p(x)|$$

Note that this implies:

1. $\operatorname{mes}E\setminus E_{\lambda}\ge \tfrac{1}{2} \operatorname{mes}E .$
2. $\forall x \in E \setminus E_{\lambda} : |p(x)| > \lambda .$

Now

$$\begin{align}
\int_{x\in E}|p(x)|^p\,\mbox{d}x &\geq \int_{x\in E \setminus E_\lambda}|p(x)|^p\,\mbox{d}x \\[6pt]
&\geq \lambda^p\frac{1}{2}\operatorname{mes}E \\[6pt]
&= \frac{1}{2}\operatorname{mes}E \left(\frac{\operatorname{mes}E}{2C \operatorname{mes}J}\right)^{p(n-1)}e^{-p\max_k |\Re \lambda_k| \, \operatorname{mes}J}\max_{x \in J} |p(x)|^p \\[6pt]
&\geq \frac{1}{2} \frac{\operatorname{mes}E}{\operatorname{mes}J}\left(\frac{\operatorname{mes} E}{2C \operatorname{mes}J}\right)^{p(n-1)}e^{-p\max_k |\Re \lambda_k| \, \operatorname{mes}J}\int_{x \in J} |p(x)|^p\,\mbox{d}x,
\end{align}$$

which completes the proof.

== Pólya inequality ==
One of the corollaries of the Remez inequality is the Pólya inequality, which was proved by George Pólya (Pólya 1928), and states that the Lebesgue measure of a sub-level set of a polynomial p of degree n is bounded in terms of the leading coefficient LC(p) as follows:

$$\operatorname{mes} \left\{ x \in \R : \left|P(x)\right| \leq a \right\} \leq 4 \left(\frac{a}{2 \mathrm{LC}(p)}\right)^{1/n}, \quad a>0~.$$
