= Set of uniqueness =

In mathematics, a set of uniqueness is a concept relevant to trigonometric expansions which are not necessarily Fourier series. Their study is a relatively pure branch of harmonic analysis.

== Definition ==
A subset E of the circle is called a set of uniqueness, or a U-set, if any trigonometric expansion

$$\sum_{n=-\infty}^{\infty}c(n)e^{int}$$

which converges to zero for $t\notin E$ is identically zero; that is, such that

c(n) = 0 for all n.

Otherwise, E is a set of multiplicity (sometimes called an M-set or a Menshov set). Analogous definitions apply on the real line, and in higher dimensions. In the latter case, one needs to specify the order of summation, e.g. "a set of uniqueness with respect to summing over balls".

To understand the importance of the definition, it is important to get out of the Fourier mind-set. In Fourier analysis there is no question of uniqueness, since the coefficients c(n) are derived by integrating the function. Hence, in Fourier analysis the order of actions is

- Start with a function f.
- Calculate the Fourier coefficients using

$$c(n)=\int_0^{2\pi}f(t)e^{-int}\,dt$$

- Ask: does the sum converge to f? In which sense?

In the theory of uniqueness, the order is different:

- Start with some coefficients c(n) for which the sum converges in some sense
- Ask: does this mean that they are the Fourier coefficients of the function?

In effect, it is usually sufficiently interesting (as in the definition above) to assume that the sum converges to zero and ask if that means that all the c(n) must be zero. As is usual in analysis, the most interesting questions arise when one discusses pointwise convergence. Hence the definition above, which arose when it became clear that neither convergence everywhere nor convergence almost everywhere give a satisfactory answer.

== Early research ==
The empty set is a set of uniqueness. This simply means that if a trigonometric series converges to zero everywhere then it is trivial. This was proved by Riemann, using a delicate technique of double formal integration; and showing that the resulting sum has some generalized kind of second derivative using Toeplitz operators. Later on, Georg Cantor generalized Riemann's techniques to show that any countable, closed set is a set of uniqueness, a discovery which led him to the development of set theory. Paul Cohen, another innovator in set theory, started his career with a thesis on sets of uniqueness.

As the theory of Lebesgue integration developed, it was assumed that any set of zero measure would be a set of uniqueness — in one dimension the locality principle for Fourier series shows that any set of positive measure is a set of multiplicity (in higher dimensions this is still an open question). This was disproved by Dimitrii E. Menshov who in 1916 constructed an example of a set of multiplicity which has measure zero.

== Transformations ==
A translation and dilation of a set of uniqueness is a set of uniqueness. A union of a countable family of closed sets of uniqueness is a set of uniqueness. There exists an example of two sets of uniqueness whose union is not a set of uniqueness, but the sets in this example are not Borel. It is an open problem whether the union of any two Borel sets of uniqueness is a set of uniqueness.

== Singular distributions ==
A closed set is a set of uniqueness if and only if there exists a distribution S supported on the set (so in particular it must be singular) such that

$$\lim_{n\to \infty}\widehat{S}(n)=0$$

($\hat S(n)$ here are the Fourier coefficients). In all early examples of sets of uniqueness, the distribution in question was in fact a measure. In 1954, though, Ilya Piatetski-Shapiro constructed an example of a set of uniqueness which does not support any measure with Fourier coefficients tending to zero. In other words, the generalization of distribution is necessary.

== Complexity of structure ==
The first evidence that sets of uniqueness have complex structure came from the study of Cantor-like sets. Raphaël Salem and Zygmund showed that a Cantor-like set with dissection ratio ξ is a set of uniqueness if and only if 1/ξ is a Pisot number, that is an algebraic integer with the property that all its conjugates (if any) are smaller than 1. This was the first demonstration that the property of being a set of uniqueness has to do with arithmetic properties and not just some concept of size (Nina Bari had proved the case of ξ rational -- the Cantor-like set is a set of uniqueness if and only if 1/ξ is an integer -- a few years earlier).

Since the 50s, much work has gone into formalizing this complexity. The family of sets of uniqueness, considered as a set inside the space of compact sets (see Hausdorff distance), was located inside the analytical hierarchy. A crucial part in this research is played by the index of the set, which is an ordinal between 1 and ω_{1}, first defined by Pyatetskii-Shapiro. Nowadays the research of sets of uniqueness is just as much a branch of descriptive set theory as it is of harmonic analysis.
