= List of eponyms (A–K) =

List of terms created from a person's name

An eponym is a person (real or fictitious) from whom something is said to take its name. The word is back-formed from "eponymous", from the Greek "eponymos" meaning "giving name".

Here is a list of eponyms:

== A ==
- Shinzō Abe, Japanese Prime Minister – Abenomics
- Niels Henrik Abel, Norwegian mathematician – abelian group, Abel's theorem, Abel–Ruffini theorem
- Helmut Abt, German-born American astrophysicist - Abt's star (SV Crateris/ β 600/ ADS 8115/ HD 98088, in the constellation Crater)
- Allama Iqbal, Indian Muslim philosopher, and poet of Urdu, Persian language, Arabic languages, national poet and ideological father of Pakistan — Allama Iqbal Town, Allama Iqbal Town, Muzaffargarh, Allama Iqbal International Airport, Allama Iqbal Medical College, Allama Iqbal Open University, Iqbal Academy Pakistan.
- Achaemenes, Persian king – Achaemenid dynasty
- Achilles, Greek mythological character – Achilles' heel, Achilles tendon
- Ada Lovelace, first person to describe computer programming (for the Babbage engine) – Ada programming language
- Adam, Biblical character – Adam's apple
- Gilbert-Joseph Adam, French mineralogist – adamite
- Alvin Adams, American businessman – Adams Express
- Adamson, Swedish comics character – Adamson Award
- Thomas Addison, British physician – Addison's disease, Addisonian crisis, Addison–Schilder syndrome
- Adelaide of Saxe-Meiningen, British queen – the city of Adelaide in Australia, Queen Adelaide, Cambridgeshire, Adelaide Archipelago, Adelaide Island
- Adhemar, Belgian comics character – Bronzen Adhemar
- Adonis, Greek mythological character – adonis (a good looking, handsome young boy), adonism, Adonis, adonis (species of skink), Adonis belt
- Aeolus, Greek mythological character – Aeolian harp
- Adam Afzelius, Swedish botanist – Afzelius's disease, afzelia
- Agag, biblical king – Agagites
- Agatha of Sicily, Italian Christian martyr – St. Agatha's Tower
- Agrippina the Younger, Roman empress – Cologne, Germany (formerly Colonia Agrippina)
- Ahasuerus, Biblical character – the term "ahasverus" is used to describe a "restless person" in certain languages, Ahasverus (genus of beetle)
- Alfred V. Aho, Canadian computer scientist – the first letter of the name AWK, a computer pattern/action language, is taken from Aho
- George Biddell Airy, English mathematician and astronomer - Airy disk
- Ajax, Greek mythological character – Ajax Amsterdam, Ajax dish detergent
- Akademos, Greek mythological character – academy
- Akela, British literary character – Akela, another term for 'scoutsleader'
- Rabbi Akiva, Judean rabbi – Bnei Akiva
- Muhammad ibn Musa al-Khwarizmi, Latinized as "Algoritmi", Persian mathematician – algorithm.
- Abd al-Rahman al-Sufi, Persian astronomer - al-Sufi's cluster (an easy-to-observe asterism in the constellation Vulpecula which looks like a coathanger, also known as Brocchi's Cluster and Collinder 399).
- Semyon Alapin, Lithuanian chess player – Alapin's Opening
- King Albert I, Belgian king – Albert Canal, Albert premetro station, Alberteum Aedes Scientiae, King Albert Park, Albertine, King Albert Medal, Albertina markers.
- Albert, Prince Consort, British prince – Prince Albert piercing, a form of male genital piercing; Albert Bridge, London, Albert Bridge, Glasgow, Royal Albert Dock, Liverpool, Royal Albert Dock, London, Royal Albert Hall, Albert Memorial, Lake Albert, Prince Albert, Saskatchewan, Prince Albert National Park, Albert Medal
- Adolf Albin, Romanian chess player – Albin Countergambit
- Alcaeus, Greek poet – Alcaic stanza
- Alexander Alekhine, Russian chess player – Alekhine's Defence
- Alexander of Aphrodisias, Greek philosopher – Alexandrism, Alexander's band
- Alexander the Great, Greek-Macedonian conqueror – Alexandria, İskenderun, Kandahar, alexandrine, Iskanderkul
- Matthew Algie, Scottish businessman – "Matthew Algie" (company)
- Alice, British literary character – Alice in Wonderland syndrome
- Thomas Allinson, British physician – Allinson bread
- Herb Alpert and Jerry Moss, American musicians – A&M Records
- Arthur Cecil Alport, South African physician – Alport syndrome
- Walter C. Alvarez, American physician − Alvarez' syndrome; Alvarez-waves; Walter C. Alvarez Memorial Award
- Alois Alzheimer, German neurologist – Alzheimer's disease
- Amanullah Khan, Afghan king – The Dutch term "ammehoela" (which means "yeah, right!" or "what do I care?")
- Amaryllis, Roman literary character from Virgil's pastoral Eclogues – amaryllis
- Amazons, Greek mythological tribe – Amazon River, Amazon.com, Inc
- Adelbert Ames Jr., American scientist — Ames room, Ames trapezoid
- Bruce Ames, American biochemist – Ames test
- Jakob Ammann, Swiss-American religious leader – Amish
- André-Marie Ampère, French scientist – ampere – unit of electric current, Ampère's law, amp
- Amun, Egyptian god – ammonia
- Roald Amundsen, Norwegian explorer – Amundsen Sea; Amundsen crater, a crater on the Moon; Amundsen–Scott South Pole Station
- Ignacio "Nacho" Anaya – inventor of nachos
- José de Anchieta, Spanish priest – Anchieta Island, Anchieta, Espírito Santo, Anchieta, Santa Catarina, Rodovia Anchieta
- Andromeda, Greek mythological character – Andromeda constellation, Andromeda Galaxy, Andromeda polifolia
- Anders Jonas Ångström, Swedish physicist – angstrom, unit of distance
- Adolf Anderssen, German chess player – Anderssen's Opening
- Saint Andrew, Christian apostle – Order of Saint Andrew, Saint Andrew's Cross, St Andrews, Scotland, San Andreas Fault, and numerous other localities, churches and cathedrals
- Jimmie Angel, American aviator - Angel Falls
- Anne of Denmark, Scottish queen – Queen Anne's Men
- Anne, Queen of Great Britain, British queen – Queen Anne style architecture, Queen Anne style furniture, Statute of Anne, Queen Anne's Bounty
- Antoninus Pius, Roman emperor – Antonine Wall
- Virginia Apgar, American physician and anesthesiologist – Apgar score
- Aphrodite, Greek mythological character – aphrodisiac
- Apollinaris of Ravenna – Apollinaris (water)
- Apollo, Greek mythological character – Apollonian and Dionysian, Apollo archetype, Apollo's belt
- Apollonius of Perga, Greek mathematician and astronomer – Apollonian circles, Apollonian gasket, Apollonian network, Apollonius' theorem, Problem of Apollonius
- Saint Thomas Aquinas, Italian philosopher – Thomism, many educational institutions
- Yasser Arafat, Palestinian politician and activist – Arafat scarf (nickname for a Palestinian keffiyeh)
- Rafael Moreno Aranzadi, nicknamed Pichichi, Spanish association football player – Pichichi Trophy
- Archimedes, Greek mathematician – Archimedes' screw, Archimedes' principle, Archimedean point, Claw of Archimedes, Archimedean solid
- Henryk Arctowski, Polish scientist and explorer – Arctowski's arc (a rare halo phenomenon)
- Argus Panoptes, Greek mythological character – argus-eyed, great argus (pheasant species), scatophagus argus (fish species)
- Albert Wojciech Adamkiewicz, Polish pathologist – Artery of Adamkiewicz
- Ariadne, Greek mythological character – Ariadne's thread (logic)
- Aristoteles, Greek mathematician and philosopher – Aristotelianism, Aristotelian ethics, Aristotelian physics, Aristotelian Society, Aristotelian theology, Aristotelia, Aristotle Mountains, Aristotle's wheel paradox, Aristotle's theory of universals, Pseudo-Aristotle
- Jacobus Arminius, Dutch theologian – Arminianism
- Louis Armstrong, American jazz musician, who was nicknamed Satchmo – Satchmo's syndrome
- William George Armstrong, British inventor and business man – Armstrong breech-loading gun, Armstrong effect
- Arthur, British-Welsh mythological king – Arthurian fantasy, Arthurian heraldry, Arthurian legend
- José Gervasio Artigas, Uruguayan revolutionary leader – Artiguism
- Asclepius, Greek mythological character – rod of Asclepius, therapeutae of Asclepius
- Hans Asperger, Austrian psychologist – Asperger syndrome
- Atalanta, Greek mythological character – Atalanta butterfly
- Mustafa Kemal Atatürk, Turkish president – Kemalism (also known as Atatürkism)
- Athena, Greek goddess – The Greek city Athens, atheneum, Athens, Athene (bird)
- Robert Atkins, American nutritionist – Atkins diet
- Atlas, Greek mythological character – atlas, Atlas, atlas, Atlas, Atlas, Atlas, Atlas bear, Atlas beetle, Atlas cedar, Atlas pied flycatcher, Atlas moth, Atlas turtle
- Atthis, Greek mythological character – Atthis, Attica
- Shlomo Zalman Auerbach, Israeli rabbi and theologist – Ramat Shlomo
- Aurélio Buarque de Holanda Ferreira, Brazilian lexicographer – Aurélio's Brazilian Portuguese Dictionary, nicknamed the "Big Aurélio" in Portuguese.
- Augeas, Greek mythological king – Augean stable
- Augustus Caesar, Roman emperor – the month of August; the city of Zaragoza (originally Caesaraugustus); the city of Caesarea in Israel; numerous other cities once named Caesarea; Augustan age
- R. Stanton Avery, American inventor and businessman – Avery Dennison Corporation
- Tex Avery - American animated film director - Avery-esque.
- Amedeo Avogadro, Italian chemist – Avogadro constant, Avogadro's law
- Nnamdi Azikiwe, Nigerian president – Zikism

== B ==
- Báb, Persian religious leader – Bábism
- Charles Babbage, British mathematician and inventor – Babbage engine, Babbage
- Isaac Babbitt, American inventor – Babbitt metal
- Joseph Babinski, French neurologist – Babinski's sign, Anton–Babinski syndrome, Babinski–Fröhlich syndrome, Babinski–Froment syndrome, Babinski–Nageotte syndrome, Babinski–Vaquez syndrome, Babinski–Weil test, Babinski–Jarkowski rule.
- Lauren Bacall, American actress – Bogart–Bacall syndrome
- Facundo Bacardi, Spanish-Cuban business man – Bacardi, Bacardi cocktail, Bacardi Breezer
- Bacchus, Greek-Roman mythological character – Bacchic, Bacchic art, Bacchanalia
- Edward Bach, British physician – Bach flower remedies
- Johann Sebastian Bach, German composer – BACH motif
- John Backus, American computer scientist – Backus–Naur form
- Karl Baedeker, German business man – Baedeker
- Leo Baekeland, Belgian inventor – Bakelite
- William Baffin, British explorer – Baffin Bay, Baffin Island
- Bahá'u'lláh, Persian religious leader – Baháʼí Faith
- Bahram V Gur, Persian king – bahramdipity
- Donald Bailey, British engineer and inventor – Bailey bridge
- Francis Baily, British astronomer – Baily's beads
- René Baire, French mathematician – Baire category theorem, Baire function, Baire measure, Baire set, Baire space, Baire space, Property of Baire
- John Randal Baker (1900–1984), English zoologist and anthropologist – Microscopic staining merthods: for lipids, Baker's acid-haematein, and for mucins his mucicarmine
- Italo Balbo, Italian aviator and politician – Balbo, Seventh Street Balbo Drive (street in Chicago)
- Ed Balducci, Italian-American illusionist – Balducci levitation
- J. G. Ballard, British author – Ballardian, Ballardesque
- János Balogh, Hungarian-Romanian chess master – Balogh Defense
- Balthazar, Biblical character – 12-litre wine bottle (see Wine bottle#Sizes)
- Honoré de Balzac, French author – Balzac Prize
- Bambi, Austrian literary character – Bambi effect, Bambi effect, Bambi Award
- Heinrich Band, German inventor and music instrument builder– Bandoneón
- Bernhard Bang, Danish physician – Bang's disease
- Peter Bang and Svend Olufsen, Danish businesspeople – Bang and Olufsen
- John Kendrick Bangs, American writer - Bangsian fantasy
- Joseph Banks, British botanist – Banks Peninsula, genus Banksia
- Baphomet, demon character – Sigil of Baphomet
- Barbara, daughter of American business woman Ruth Handler – Barbie doll
- Joseph Barbera and William Hanna, American animators – Hanna-Barbera
- Willem Barentsz, Dutch explorer – Barents Sea, Barentsz bridge, Barents Region
- Francis Baring, British businessman – Barings Bank
- Heinrich Barkhausen, German physicist – Barkhausen effect, Barkhausen stability criterion, Barkhausen–Kurz tube
- Peter Barlow, English mathematician and physicist — Barlow lens
- Thomas Wilson Barnes, British chess master – Barnes Defence, Barnes Opening
- P. T. Barnum, American circus entertainer – Barnum effect
- Murray Barr, Canadian physician – Barr body
- Yvonne Barr and Sir Anthony Epstein, British physicians – Epstein–Barr virus
- Jean Alexandre Barré, French neurologist – Guillain–Barré syndrome, Barré test
- Caspar Bartholin the Younger, Danish physician – Bartholin's gland
- Béla Bartók, Hungarian composer – Bartok pizzicato
- Basarab I of Wallachia – Bessarabia
- Earl W. Bascom, American-Canadian rodeo inventor – Bascom's rigging
- John U. Bascom, American surgeon – Bascom cleft lift procedure
- Karl Adolph von Basedow, German physician – Graves–Basedow disease
- John Baskerville, British typographer – Baskerville
- George Bass, British explorer – Bass Strait
- Tomáš Baťa, Czech businessman – Bata Shoes; Bata Shoe Museum, Tomas Bata University in Zlín, Batawa; Batanagar, India; Batapur, Punjab, Pakistan
- Henry Walter Bates, British biologist – Batesian mimicry
- Émile Baudot, French engineer – Baudot alphabet, Baudot code
- Antoine Baumé, French engineer – Baumé scale
- Bavo of Ghent, Southern-Dutch/Walloon Roman Catholic saint – Bamberg, Germany
- Donald E. Baxter and Delia B. Baxter – Baxter International
- Bryce Bayer, American scientist – Bayer filter
- Friedrich Bayer, German business man – Bayer
- Herbert Bayer, Austrian-American graphic designer and architect – Bayer Universal, Architype Bayer
- William Bayliss, British physician – Bayliss effect
- The Beatles, British rock group – Beatlesque, Beatle boot, Beatle haircut, Beatlemania
- Francis Beaufort, Irish captain – Beaufort scale
- Louis de Béchamel, a courtier of Louis XIV – Béchamel sauce
- Alison Bechdel, American cartoonist – Bechdel test
- Carl Bechstein, German businessman – C. Bechstein
- Warren A. Bechtel, American businessman – Bechtel
- Heinrich Beck, German businessman – Beck's beer, Beck's Futures art prize
- John Bruce Beckwith, American physician – Beckwith–Wiedemann syndrome
- Henri Becquerel, French physicist – becquerel
- John Russell, 4th Duke of Bedford, British politician – Bedfordite
- Captain Beefheart, American rock musician - Beefheart-esque (dissonant rock music reminiscent of his musical style).
- Michel Bégon, French politician – begonia
- Hulusi Behçet, Turkish dermatologist – Behçet's disease
- Adrian Bejan, Romanian-American mathematician – Bejan number
- Léon Bekaert, Belgian businessman – Bekaert
- Jacob Bekenstein, Israelian-American theoretical physicist – Bekenstein bound
- Édouard Belin, French-Swiss inventor – Belinograph
- Alexander Graham Bell, Scottish inventor – bel – unit of relative power level; Bell Labs, Bell System, BellSouth, Bellcore (now Telcordia Technologies), Regional Bell Operating Company, Bell Canada – companies.
- Glen Bell, American restaurateur - Taco Bell
- Francis Bellamy, American religious leader – Bellamy salute
- Fabian Gottlieb von Bellingshausen, Estonian-German explorer – Bellingshausen Sea
- Nikos Beloyannis, Greek resistance leader – Beloiannisz (village in Hungary)
- Eliezer Ben-Yehuda, Litvak lexicographer – Ben Yehuda Street, Ben Yehuda Street (Tel Aviv)
- Benedick, British theatrical character – benedick
- Benedict of Nursia, Italian priest – Benedictine
- Edvard Beneš, Czech president – Beneš decrees
- Luciano Benetton, Italian business man – Benetton Group, Benetton Formula
- Charles Benham, English journalist - Benham's top / Benham's disc (a rotating black-and-white disc to show the Fechner color effect)
- Benjamin, Biblical character – a Benjamin (in some languages the youngest son of a family is referred to by this name)
- Pal Benko, Hungarian chess player – Benko Gambit, Benko's Opening
- Arnold Bennett, British novelist – Omelette Arnold Bennett, dish developed at the Savoy Hotel, London
- Floyd Bennett, NASA trajectory designer — Bennett Hill (a lunar mountain, west of the landing site of Apollo 15)
- Linn Boyd Benton, American typographer – Benton Pantograph
- Karl Benz, German businessman – Benz & Cie. (later Daimler-Benz)
- Hiram Berdan, American inventor – Berdan Sharps rifle, Berdan centerfire primer
- Hans Berenberg and Paul Berenberg, German businessman – Berenberg Bank
- Vitus Bering, Danish-born Russian explorer – Bering Strait, Commander Islands
- Busby Berkeley, American choreographer – "Busby Berkeley choreography", "Busby Berkeley number" (an elaborate sing and dance number with many people involved, usually in a geometrical arrangement)
- David Berkowitz also known as "Son of Sam", American criminal – Son of Sam law
- Emile Berliner, German-American inventor and businessman – Berliner Gramophone
- Maximilian Berlitz, German-American businessman – Berlitz Language Schools
- Juan de Bermúdez, Spanish explorer – Bermuda
- Daniel Bernoulli, Dutch mathematician – Bernoulli's principle
- Sergei Natanovich Bernstein, Russian mathematician – Bernstein polynomial, Bernstein algebra, Bernstein's inequality, Bernstein inequalities in probability theory, Bernstein polynomial, Bernstein's problem, Bernstein's theorem, Bernstein's theorem on monotone functions, Bernstein–von Mises theorem
- Yogi Berra, American baseball player – Yogi Bear, Yogiisms
- Claude Louis Berthollet, French chemist – Berthollide
- Alphonse Bertillon, French police officer – Bertillon method/system.
- Henry Bessemer, British inventor – Bessemer converter, Bessemer steel
- Aneurin Bevan, British politician – Bevanism
- Pierre Bézier, French engineer and mathematician – Bézier curve, Bézier surface
- Wilhelm von Bezold, German physicist and meteorologist — Bezold effect, Bezold-Brücke shift
- Marcel Bich, French-Italian businessman – Bic
- Joe Biden, 46th president of the United States – Bidenomics
- Bieda, a Saxon landowner ("Bieda's ford" + shire) – Bedfordshire
- Max Bielschowsky (1869–1940), German neuropathologist – Bielschowsky's silver stain for nerve fibres
- Big Brother, British literary character – "Big Brother society" (a society where government surveillance is omnipresent), Big Brother Awards
- Félix Billet, French physician - Billet's rose (a disc shaped scheme, showing the distribution and radii of the first nineteen order rainbows created by an optically infinite pointlike lightsource shining in and through perfect sphere shaped transparent water droplets)
- Alfred Binet, French mathematician – Stanford-Binet IQ test
- Meyer Herman Bing and Frederik Vilhelm Grøndahl, Danish business people – Bing & Grøndahl
- Bintje Jansma, Dutch pupil – Bintje
- Forrest Bird, American inventor – Bird Innovator
- Henry Bird, British chess player – Bird's Opening
- Clarence Birdseye, American businessman – Captain Birdseye
- Jane Birkin, British pop singer and actress – Birkin bag.
- László Bíró, Hungarian inventor – Biro, (ballpoint pen)
- Sereno Edwards Bishop, scientist, Presbyterian minister and publisher - Bishop's Ring
- Otto von Bismarck, German chancellor – Bismarck Archipelago and Bismarck Sea near New Guinea; German battleship Bismarck as well as two ships of the Imperial Navy (Kaiserliche Marine); Bismarck, North Dakota, Bismarck herring
- Fischer Black and Myron Scholes, American economists – Black–Scholes formula, Black–Scholes equation
- S. Duncan Black and Alonzo G. Decker, American business men – Black & Decker
- Tony Blair, British Prime Minister – Blairism, Blatcherism
- William Blair - Blair Cuspids (so-called needle shaped objects on the Moon's surface, created by long shadows of boulders lit by a low sun)
- Louis Auguste Blanqui, French politician and activist – Blanquism
- Louis Blériot, French aviator – Recherches Aéronautiques Louis Blériot.
- Charles K. Bliss, Ukrainian-Austrian engineer – Blissymbols.
- André Bloch, French mathematician, Bloch space, Bloch's theorem (complex variables)
- Felix Bloch, Swiss-American physician – Bloch wall, Bloch sphere, Bloch's theorem
- Charles Blondin, French acrobat – Blondin (quarry equipment)
- Amelia Bloomer, American activist – bloomers
- Benjamin Blumenfeld, Belarusian chess player – Blumenfeld Gambit
- Boann, Irish mythological character – The River Boyne
- Johann Elert Bode and Johann Daniel Titius, German astronomers – Titius–Bode law
- David Bodian (1910–1992), – American medical scientist – Bodian's protargol stain
- Giambattista Bodoni, Italian typographer – Bodoni
- William Boeing, American aviator – Boeing Commercial Airplanes
- Herman Boerhaave, Dutch physician – Boerhaave syndrome
- Humphrey Bogart, American actor – Bogart–Bacall syndrome
- Efim Bogoljubov, Russian-German chess player – Bogo-Indian Defence
- Bogomil, Bulgarian religious leader – Bogomilism
- Niels Bohr, Danish physicist – Bohr magneton, Bohr radius, bohrium
- Lecoq de Boisbaudran, French chemist – gallium, chemical element. Although named after Gallia (Latin for France), Lecoq de Boisbaudran, the discoverer of the metal, subtly attached an association with his name. Lecoq (rooster) in Latin is gallus.
- Bart Jan Bok, Dutch astronomer – Bok globules
- Simón Bolívar, Bolivian general and president – Bolivia, Bolívar Department, Colombia, various cities and tows named Bolívar en Venezuela and Colombia, Venezuelan bolívar, Bolívar, Bolivarism
- Jean Bolland, Belgian priest – Bollandists
- Lucas Bols, Dutch businessman – Bols (brand)
- Ludwig Boltzmann, German mathematician – Boltzmann constant, Stefan–Boltzmann constant, Stefan–Boltzmann law
- Napoleon Bonaparte, French general and emperor – Bonapartism, Napoleonic Code, Napoleon Empire, Napoleonic Wars, Napoleon complex, Napoleon Opening, Napoleon's theorem, Napoleon's problem, Napoleon snake eel, Napoleon fish, Napoleon, Napoleon points, Napoleonka
- George Alan Bond, American-Australian business man – Bonds
- George Boole, British mathematician – Boolean algebra
- Gail Borden, American business man – "Borden Condensed Milk", Borden County, Texas
- Jules Bordet, Belgian physicist – Bordetella
- Amadeo Bordiga, Italian politician – Bordigism
- Armand Borel, French mathematician – Borel–Weil–Bott theorem, Borel conjecture, Borel fixed-point theorem, Borel's theorem
- Émile Borel, French mathematician – Borel algebra, Borel's lemma, Borel's law of large numbers, Borel measure, Borel–Kolmogorov paradox, Borel–Cantelli lemma, Borel–Carathéodory theorem, Heine–Borel theorem, Borel summation, Borel distribution
- Alexander Borodin, Russian composer and chemist – Borodin reaction
- Karel Havlíček Borovský, Czech novelist – Havlíčkův Brod
- Giuseppe Borsalino, Italian businessman – Borsalino
- Bernard Bosanquet, British cricketer – bosie, the Australian term for the cricket technique googly
- Hieronymus Bosch, Dutch painter – Boschian
- Robert Bosch, German business man and inventor – Robert Bosch GmbH
- Amar Bose, American business man and inventor – Bose Corporation, Bose speaker packages
- Satyendra Nath Bose, Indian physicist – bosons, Bose–Einstein statistics, Bose–Einstein condensate
- Jean-Marc Bosman, Belgian association football player – Bosman ruling
- C. F. Bottlinger - Bottlinger's rings (ellipse shaped rings around the Subsun)
- Elbert Dysart Botts, American engineer and inventor – Botts' dots, a street and highway lane separator
- Louis Antoine de Bougainville, French navigator – the bougainvillea plant, which he discovered.
- Pierre Bouguer, French mathematician, geophysicist, geodesist, and astronomer - Bouguer's halo (aka Ulloa's circle, the Fog bow)
- Georges Boulanger, French politician – Boulangism
- Étienne-Louis Boullée, French neoclassicist architect – Boulléesque
- Matthew Boulton and James Watt, British inventors and business people – Boulton and Watt
- Habib Bourguiba, Tunesian president – Bourguibism
- Thierry Boutsen, Belgian car racer – Boutsen Aviation
- Sir Frank Bowden, 1st Baronet, British businessman – Bowden cable.
- Thomas Bowdler, British publisher – to bowdlerize
- Jim Bowie, American inventor – Bowie knife
- Sir William Bowman, British anatomist – Bowman's capsule
- Charles Boycott, Irish politician – boycott
- Robert Boyle, Irish chemist – Boyle's law
- Rudolph Boysen, American horticulturist – boysenberry
- Silvius Brabo, Belgian mythological character – Brabant, Brabo Fountain.
- Tycho Brahe, Danish astronomer – Tychonic system, Tycho Brahe days
- Tom Bradley, American politician – Bradley effect.
- Brahma, Hindu deity – Brahmanism
- Brahmagupta, Indian mathematician and astronomer – Brahmagupta's formula, Brahmagupta's identity, Brahmagupta's trapezium, Brahmagupta's problem, Brahmagupta's polynomial
- Johannes Brahms, German composer – Brahms guitar
- Louis Braille, French inventor – braille writing
- Matthew Bramley, British butcher – Bramley apple
- Karl Ferdinand Braun, German physicist – "Braun tube" (in some languages the cathode-ray tube is referred to as such) Karl Ferdinand Braun Prize
- Auguste Bravais, French physicist known for his work in crystallography - Bravais arc (aka the Circumzenithal arc)
- Pierre Savorgnan de Brazza, Italian explorer – Brazzaville, De Brazza's monkey
- Abraham-Louis Breguet, Swiss watch maker – Breguet (brand)
- Louis Charles Breguet, French aviator – Breguet Aviation, Breguet 14, Breguet's range equation
- Jacques Brel, Belgian singer – Brelian crescendo
- Hans-Joachim Bremermann, German-American mathematician and biophysicist – Bremermann's limit.
- Louis Brennan, Irish-Australian inventor - Brennan torpedo.
- Jack Elton Bresenham, American computer scientist – Bresenham's line algorithm
- Ebenezer Cobham Brewer, British lexicographer – Brewer's Dictionary of Phrase and Fable
- Leonid Brezhnev, Russian head of state – Brezhnev Doctrine
- Richard Bright, British physician – Bright's disease
- Jean Anthelme Brillat-Savarin, French gastronomer – Brillat-Savarin cheese, Gâteau Savarin
- Thomas Brisbane, British politician – Brisbane and Brisbane River
- Paul Broca, French neurologist – Broca's aphasia, Broca's area
- Dalmero Francis Brocchi, amateur astronomer and chart maker for the American Association of Variable Star Observers (AAVSO) - Brocchi's Cluster
- Steve Brodie, American man who jumped off Brooklyn Bridge and survived, becoming a celebrity afterwards - "do a Brodie" or "pull a Brodie" (U.S. slang for "jumping off a bridge", or "taking a chance" or a specific suicidal one.)
- Henry James Brooke, British crystallographer – Brookite
- Mel Brooks, American film director and actor – Brooksfilms
- Gordon Brown, British Prime Minister – Brownism
- Robert Brown, Scottish botanist – Brownian motion
- John Browning, American inventor – Browning firearms, including the M1918 Browning Automatic Rifle and Browning Hi-Power
- Archibald Bruce, American mineralogist – Brucite.
- Catherine Wolfe Bruce, American humanitarian activist – Bruce Medal.
- David Bruce, Australian-Scottish pathologist and microbiologist – Brucella, brucellosis.
- James Bruce, Scottish explorer – brucine.
- R. H. Bruck, American mathematician – Bruck–Ryser–Chowla theorem
- Anton Bruckner, Austrian composer – Bruckner rhythm
- Pieter Bruegel the Elder, Flemish painter – Bruegelian (a jolly eat- and drink festivity which resembles scenes from his paintings.), Bruegel, Brueghel's syndrome, "Bruegel Ancienne" (a Belgian beer brand)
- Johannes Brugman, Dutch priest – "praten als Brugman" ("to talk like Brugman", indicating a powerful speech)
- Marcus Junius Brutus, Italian politician – brutal, brutality, brute
- Prince Brychan, British king – Brecknockshire
- Bucca, Saxon landowner ("Bucca's home" + shire) – Buckinghamshire
- Bucephalus, horse of Alexander the Great – Bucephala (city), Bucephala (bird)
- Buddha, Nepalese religious leader – Buddhism
- Semyon Budyonny, Russian general – Budyonny horse
- Ettore Bugatti, Italian businessman – Bugatti
- Muhammadu Buhari, Nigerian president – Buharism
- David Dunbar Buick, American businessman – Buick
- Dagwood Bumstead, American comics character – Dagwood sandwich
- Archie Bunker, American TV character – the Bunker vote (political term describing the affiliations of mainly white, lower class voters who share conservative, bigoted viewpoints with Bunker)
- Robert Bunsen, German inventor – Bunsen burner
- Viktor Bunyakovsky, Russian mathematician – Bunyakovsky conjecture
- Johan Burgers Dutch businessman — Royal Burgers' Zoo
- Jean Buridan, French philosopher – Buridan's ass
- William Burke, Irish criminal – to burke (to execute someone by suffocation)
- Robert Burns, Scottish poet – Burns stanza
- Ambrose Burnside, American general – sideburns
- Wilhelm Busch, German comics artist and illustrator – Wilhelm Busch Prize
- George W. Bush, American president – Bush Doctrine, Bushism
- Lord Byron, British poet – Byronic; Byronism

== C ==
- John Cadbury, British businessman – Cadbury
- Antoine de la Mothe Cadillac, French explorer – Cadillac
- Julius Caesar, Roman consul and general – the month of July, Caesar cipher, the titles Czar, Tsar, and Kaiser, the Bloody Caesar cocktail. An urban legend also erroneously credits Julius Caesar as having given his name to the caesarean section; the two are likely unrelated, however.
- Cain, Biblical character – Cain's mark
- Santiago Ramón y Cajal, Spanish physician – Cajal's cell
- Calimero, Italian cartoon character – Calimero complex (used to denote people who are staunchly convinced that their position as an underdog is due to their smaller size, either literally or symbolically, which covers up for their own shortcomings). In some languages, like Italian and Israeli Hebrew the word "calimero" is also used to refer to biker helmets.
- Guy Stewart Callendar, British inventor - Callendar effect.
- John Calvin, Swiss theologian – Calvinism.
- Calypso, Greek mythological character – calypso (plant), calypso music, calypso (camera).
- Pierre Cambronne, French general – The French word "cambronniser" and the expression "le mot de Cambronne" ("The word of Cambronne"), which both refer to the vulgar expression "merde"!" ("shit!") he uttered during the Battle of Waterloo
- Gaspare Campari, Italian businessman – Campari
- Joseph A. Campbell, American businessman – Campbell's
- Canaan (son of Ham), biblical character – Canaan
- Myrtelle Canavan, American physician – Canavan's disease
- Candaules, Lydian king – candaulism
- Stanislao Cannizzaro (1826–1910), Italian chemist – Cannizzaro reaction
- Georg Cantor, German mathematician – Cantor algebra, Cantor cube, Cantor function, Cantor space, Cantor's back-and-forth method, Cantor–Bernstein theorem, Heine–Cantor theorem
- Joseph Capgras, French psychologist – Capgras delusion
- Frank Capra, American film director – Capraesque
- Caran d'Ache, French cartoonist – Caran d'Ache
- Gerolamo Cardano, Italian mathematician and physician – cardan joint, Cardan grille, Cardano's Rings
- Caesar Cardini, Italian-American restaurateur – Caesar salad
- Jonathan Carey, American autistic child – Jonathan's Law
- Carl Carl, Polish-born actor and theatre director – Carltheater
- Infante Carlos, Count of Molina, Spanish king – Carlism
- Carlota Joaquina of Spain, Portuguese queen – Carlotism, Teatro Nacional de São Carlos
- Horatio Caro, British chess player – Caro–Kann Defence
- Vittore Carpaccio, Italian painter – carpaccio
- Philip Carteret, British explorer – Carteret Islands
- Sam Carr, neighbour of American serial killer David Berkowitz also known as "Son of Sam" – Son of Sam law
- Enrico Caruso, Italian opera tenor – Caruso Sauce
- Giacomo Casanova, Italian adventurer and diarist – casanova (a womanizer)
- Hendrik Casimir, Dutch physicist – Casimir effect
- Cassandra, Greek mythological character – Cassandra
- Laurent Cassegrain, French inventor – Cassegrain reflecting telescope
- John Cassell, English publisher and businessman – his eponymous product 'Cazzoline' was the origin of the word 'gasoline'.
- Giovanni Domenico Cassini, Italian astronomer and mathematician – Cassini Division, Cassini oval, Cassini's laws, Cassini and Catalan identities, Cassini's moon maiden (a pareidolia in Promontorium Heraclides near Sinus Iridum), Cassini's bright spot (a high-albedo craterlet with bright nimbus on the floor of the walled plain Deslandres on the moon)
- Paul de Casteljau, French physicist and mathematician – De Casteljau's algorithm
- Fidel Castro, Cuban president – Castroism
- Catherine of Alexandria, Christian martyr – Catherine wheel.
- Catherine I of Russia, Russian empress – Yekaterinburg, Catherine Palace, Catherine Park
- Augustin-Louis Cauchy, French mathematician – List of things named after Augustin-Louis Cauchy
- William Cavendish, 6th Duke of Devonshire, British nobleman - Cavendish banana.
- Eduard Čech, Czech mathematician – Čech cohomology, Čech complex, Čech homology, Stone–Čech compactification
- Hugh Cecil, 1st Baron Quickswood, British politician – Hughligans
- Celadon, French literary character – celadon
- Anders Celsius, Swedish physicist and astronomer – degree Celsius (unit of temperature) Celsius (Moon crater)
- Cerberus, Greek mythological character – Cerberus (protein), Cerberus (snake)
- Ceredig, British Celtic chieftain – Cardigan
- Clyde Cessna, American aviator and businessman – Cessna Aircraft.
- Mr. Chadband, British literary character – Chadband
- Carlos Chagas, Brazilian physician – Chagas disease
- Harry Chamberlin, American inventor — Chamberlin
- Jacques-François de Chambray, French governor – Fort Chambray
- Subrahmanyan Chandrasekhar, Indian-American astronomer and physicist – Chandrasekhar limit, Chandra X-ray Observatory
- Coco Chanel, French fashion designer – Chanel, Chanel No. 5
- Chaos, Greek mythological character – chaos.
- Charlie Chaplin, British comedian, film actor and director – Chaplinesque, Chaplin moustache.
- Jean-Antoine Chaptal, French chemist – chaptalization
- Jean-Martin Charcot, French neurologist – Charcot–Marie–Tooth disease; Maladie de Charcot, the French name for motor neurone disease
- Charles I of England, English king – North Carolina and South Carolina
- Charles III of Monaco, Monegasque king – Monte Carlo
- Charles IV, Holy Roman Emperor – places called Carlsbad, Karlstein Castle, Karlovy Vary, Charles University, Charles Bridge
- Charles VI, Holy Roman Emperor – château Karlova Koruna
- Jacques Charles and Joseph Louis Gay-Lussac, French physicists – Law of Charles and Gay-Lussac (frequently called simply Charles' Law)
- Carl Charlier, Swedish astronomer and physicist – Charlier polynomials
- Bobby Charlton, British association football player – the "Bobby Charlton" comb over hairstyle.
- Charlotte of Mecklenburg-Strelitz, British queen – Queen Charlotte Islands, Queen Charlotte City, Queen Charlotte Sound, Fort Charlotte, Charlottesville, Virginia, Charlottesville, Virginia
- Michel Chasles, French mathematician – Chasles' theorem
- François-René de Chateaubriand, French writer – Chateaubriand steak
- Nicolas Chauvin, French soldier – chauvinism
- Hugo Chávez, Venezuelan president – Chavismo
- Anton Chekhov, Russian playwright – Chekhov's gun
- Vitaly Chekhover, Russian chess player – Sicilian Defence, Chekhover Variation
- Pavel Alekseyevich Cherenkov, Russian physicist – Cherenkov effect
- Louis Chevrolet, French businessman – Chevrolet
- Chewbacca, film character – Chewbacca defense
- Chimaera, Greek mythological character – Chimaera (The term "chimaera" has come to describe any mythical or fictional animal with parts taken from various animals, or to describe anything composed of very disparate parts, or perceived as wildly imaginative, implausible, or dazzling).
- Thomas Chippendale, British furniture designer – Chippendale furniture.
- Ernst Chladni, German physicist – Chladni patterns
- Jesus Christ, Biblical prophet – Christianity, Christmas, Christ complex (also known as Messianic complex), Christchurch, Jesuit Jesus' nickname "The Saviour" also inspired the name of El Salvador.
- Agatha Christie, British novelist – Agatha Christie indult
- James Christie, British auctioner – Christie's
- Saint Christopher, Christian martyr – Saint Kitts and Nevis.
- Walter Chrysler, American businessman – Chrysler, DaimlerChrysler, Chrysler Building
- Alfred Chuang, Chinese-American computer scientist – The third letter of the company name BEA Systems, is taken from his first name.
- Alonzo Church, American mathematician – Church–Turing thesis, Church–Turing–Deutsch principle
- Charles Churchill, American-British businessman – Churchill Machine Tool Company
- Winston Churchill, British Prime Minister – Churchill tank, Churchill cigars, Churchill (cocktail)
- Cincinnatus, Roman politician – Cincinnati (indirectly)
- Cinderella, European fairy tale character – Cinderella, Cinderella complex, Cinderella effect
- André Citroën, French businessman – Citroën
- Senator Claghorn, character on the Fred Allen radio show – Foghorn Leghorn
- Claude of France, French queen – Reine Claude
- Claudius, Roman emperor – the city of Kayseri, formerly Caesarea Mazaca, in Turkey.
- Moses Cleaveland, American politician – Cleveland
- Gaëtan Gatian de Clérambault, French psychologist – Kandinsky–Clérambault syndrome
- Ruth Cleveland, daughter of American president Grover Cleveland – Baby Ruth candy bars.
- Bill Clinton, American president – Clintonomics, Clintonism, Clintonian
- Henri Coandă, Romanian inventor – Coandă effect
- John Robert Cobb, American physician – Cobb angle
- Richard Cobden, British politician – Cobdenism
- Richard Temple, 1st Viscount Cobham, British politician and soldier – Cobhamite
- John Cockerill, British businessman – Cockerill-Sambre
- William Frederick "Buffalo Bill" Cody, American frontiersman and entertainer – Cody, Wyoming
- Jean-Baptiste Colbert, French politician – Colbertism, Colbert coat, sauce Colbert
- William T. Coleman III, American businessman – the first letter of the company name BEA Systems, is taken from his first name.
- Edgard Colle, Belgian chess player – Colle System
- Samuel Colt, American gun inventor – Colt revolver.
- Christopher Columbus, Italian explorer – Egg of Columbus; many places and territories, see Columbus, Colombia, Colombo, British Columbia in Canada
- Arthur Compton, American physicist – Compton scattering
- Nicolas de Condorcet, French mathematician and philosopher – Condorcet method
- Confucius, Chinese philosopher – Confucianism
- Constantine I, Roman Emperor – Constantinople
- Nicolas-Jacques Conté, French inventor – Conté crayon
- James Cook, British explorer – Cook Islands; Cooktown, Queensland; James Cook University (Townsville); Cook (suburb of Canberra; co-named for Sir Joseph Cook); Cooks River; Cook (Federal electorate); James Cook University Hospital (Marton, Middlesbrough, England); Aoraki / Mount Cook; Cook Strait
- D. B. Cooper, American criminal – Cooper vane
- Kenneth H. Cooper, American physician – Cooper test
- Ralph Copeland, English astronomer - Copeland Septet
- Nicolaus Copernicus, Polish astronomer – Copernican heliocentrism, Copernican Revolution, Copernican principle, copernicium
- Godfrey Copley, British art collector – Copley Medal
- Gaspard-Gustave de Coriolis, French mathematician – Coriolis effect
- Pierre Corneille, French playwright – Cornelian dilemma
- Nicolas Cotoner, Maltese prince – Cottonera Lines
- Charles-Augustin de Coulomb, French physicist – coulomb, Coulomb's law
- Thomas Cowling, British mathematician and astronomer – Cowling model
- William Cowper, British anatomist – Cowper's gland
- Michael Cowpland, British businessman – Corel (the first two letters were lifted from his first name), Mitel with Terry Matthews (Mitel stands MIke and TErry's Lawnmowers)
- Richard Cox, British horticulturist – Cox's Orange Pippin
- Bettino Craxi, Italian Prime Minister – Craxism
- Seymour Cray, American computerengineer and inventor – Cray Research
- Elliott Cresson, American businessman – Elliott Cresson Medal
- Hans Gerhard Creutzfeldt and Alfons Maria Jakob, German physicians – Creutzfeldt–Jakob disease
- Burrill Bernard Crohn, American physician – Crohn's disease
- Jim Crow, American theatrical character – Jim Crow law
- Robert Crumb, American comic artist - Crumb-esque (artwork drawn in his characteristic style).
- Robinson Crusoe, British literary character – Robinsonade, Robinson Crusoe economy
- Johan Cruyff, Dutch association football player – Cruijffiaans
- Cunedda, Welsh king – Gwynedd
- Cupid, Greek-Roman mythological character – Cupid's bow
- Marie and Pierre Curie, French physicists – Curie, curium
- Pierre Curie, French physicist – Curie point
- Haskell Curry, American mathematician – currying, Curry's paradox, Curry–Howard correspondence
- Robert E. Curtiss - Curtiss' cross (a clair-obscur effect on the moon's surface, created by low western sunlight shining on the Fra Mauro Zeta complex (Fra Mauro ζ complex), showing some sort of Maltese cross)
- Mary Curzon, Baroness Curzon of Kedleston, British noblewomen – Lady Curzon Soup
- Cush (Bible), biblical character – Kingdom of Kush
- Harvey Cushing, American physician – Cushing's syndrome
- Saint Cuthbert, Celtic priest ("church of Cuthbert") – Kirkcudbright
- Saint Cyril, Greek missionary – Cyrillic alphabet

== D ==
- Dactyl, Greek mythological character – dactyly, syndactyly, polydactyly.
- Daedalus, Greek mythological character – Daedala
- Adolf Daens, Belgian priest and politician – Daensism.
- Dagmar, American actress, model and TV star - Dagmar bumpers.
- Louis Daguerre, French photographer and inventor – Daguerreotype
- Anders Dahl, Swedish botanist – Dahlia
- Gottlieb Daimler and Karl Benz, German businesspeople – DaimlerBenz (later DaimlerChrysler)
- Dalek, British TV character – Popular nickname for the Bridgewater Place, Dalekmania
- Salvador Dalí, Spanish painter – Dalí moustache, Dalíesque
- John Dalton, British physicist and chemist – dalton, non-SI unit of atomic mass, Daltonism
- Tadd Dameron, American jazz musician – Tadd Dameron turnaround
- Pedro Damiano, Portuguese chess player – Damiano Defence
- Damocles, Greek mythological character – Sword of Damocles
- John Frederic Daniell, British chemist - Daniel cell.
- Glenn Danzig – Danzig (band)
- Daphne, Greek mythological character – Daphne, daphnia
- Henry Darcy, French engineer – darcy, Darcy's law
- Charles Darwin, British biologist – Darwinism, Neural Darwinism, Social Darwinism, Darwinian Happiness, Darwin's theory of evolution, Darwinian selection, Non-darwinian evolution, Darwinian medicine, Darwin, Northern Territory, Darwin Mounds, Charles Darwin University, Darwin College, Cambridge, Charles Darwin National Park, Darwin Awards, Darwin's finches, Darwin Island, another Darwin Island, Charles Darwin Research Station, Darwin Bay, Lecocarpus darwinii (a tree species), Charles Darwin Foundation, Darwin's Arch
- Adi Dassler, German businessman – adidas
- David, biblical character – Star of David, City of David, David's harp
- Jean-Baptist David, Belgian activist – Davidsfonds
- Arthur Davidson and William S. Harley, American businesspeople – Harley–Davidson
- John Davis, British explorer – Davis quadrant
- Humphry Davy, British chemist and inventor – Davy lamp
- Richard Dawkins, British scientist and activist – Dawkinsia, Richard Dawkins Award
- Gene Day, Canadian comics artist – Howard E. Day Prize
- Deborah, biblical character – Deborah number (dimensionless number in rheology)
- Paul de Casteljau, French mathematician – de Casteljau's algorithm
- Daniel De Leon, American trade union leader – De Leonism
- Manfred Deix, Austrian cartoonist - Deixfigure (or Deix characters: people who look like characters from his cartoons.)
- John DeLorean, American car inventor – DeLorean.
- Michael Dell, American businessman – founder of Dell, the computer company
- John and Peter Delmonico, Swiss-American restaurant holders – Delmonico steak
- Demosthenes, Greek orator – Demosthenic
- Deng Xiaoping, Chinese head of state – Deng Xiaoping Theory
- Arnaud Denjoy, French mathematician – Denjoy integral
- Thomas Derrick (c. 1600), British hangman – Derrick (lifting device)
- René Descartes, French philosopher – Cartesian coordinate system, Cartesianism
- David Deutsch, Israeli-British physicist – Church–Turing–Deutsch principle
- Melvil Dewey, American librarian – Dewey Decimal System
- Thomas Dewey, American politician – Dewey, one of "Huey, Dewey and Louie", animated cartoon characters
- Porfirio Díaz, Mexican dictator – Porfiriato
- Charles Dickens, British novelist – Dickensian
- Saint Didacus, Spanish priest – San Diego
- Bo Diddley, American blues/rock and roll singer and guitarist – Bo Diddley beat
- Rudolf Diesel, German inventor – diesel engine
- Milovan Đilas, Yugoslav politician - Đilasism
- Diogenes, Greek philosopher – Diogenes syndrome
- Dionysus, Greek mythological character – Dionysia
- Paul Dirac, French mathematician – Dirac fermion, Dirac spinor, Dirac equation, Dirac delta function, Dirac sea, Dirac Prize, Fermi–Dirac statistics
- Johann Dirichlet, German mathematician – Dirichlet function, Dirichlet's theorem on arithmetic progressions
- Walt Disney, American animator and film producer – The Walt Disney Company, Disneyland, Disneyfication, Disney-esque, Disneyism
- Edward Divers, British chemist – Divers's solution
- François Divisia, French economist – divisia index
- Jeremiah Dixon and Charles Mason, British astronomers – Mason–Dixon line
- Albert Döderlein, German physician – Döderlein's bacilli
- John Francis Dodge and Horace Dodge, American businesspeople – Dodge
- Dogberry, British theatrical character – dogberryism (synonym for malapropism)
- Karl Gottfried Paul Döhle, German pathologist – Döhle bodies
- Doily, British draper – doily
- Ray Dolby, American inventor – Dolby Stereo, Dolby Surround and Dolby Pro Logic
- Domhnall mac Raghnaill, Hebridean magnate – Clann Domhnaill
- Don Juan, Spanish theatrical character – don juan (womanizer), Don Juanism
- Don Quixote, Spanish literary character – Don Quixote character, Don Quixote complex, Quixotism
- Donatello, Italian painter – Donatello, one of the Teenage Mutant Ninja Turtles comic characters
- Christian Doppler, Austrian physicist – Doppler radar, Doppler effect
- Donald Wills Douglas, Sr., American aviator – Douglas Aircraft Company
- Charles Dow and Edward Jones, American businesspeople – Dow Jones & Company
- Herbert Dow, Canadian-American businessman – Dow Chemical Company
- John Langdon Down, English physician – Down syndrome
- Jimmy "Popeye" Doyle, American literary character – Popeyes Louisiana Kitchen and not the comic and cartoon character Popeye the Sailor.
- Draco, Greek lawmaker – Draconian laws (very severe or cruel laws.)
- Henry Draper, American astronomer – Draper, lunar impact crater
- John William Draper, English-American physician, chemist and photographer – Draper point
- Willem Drees, Dutch Prime Minister – "van drees trekken" (Dutch term for receiving an old age pension financed by the government.)
- Fritz E. Dreifuss, American physician – Emery–Dreifuss muscular dystrophy
- Dubgall mac Somairle, King of the Isles – Clann Dubgaill
- Donald Duck, American cartoon character – Donald Duck voice, Donaldism
- Louis Dufay - Dufaycolor
- Dulcinea, Spanish literary character – a dulcinea (synonym for mistress, sweetheart or an unrequited/platonic love.)
- John Saumarez Dumaresq, British naval officer - Dumaresq (a mechanical computer)
- Dumbo, American cartoon character – Dumbo ears (derogatory term for big ears)
- Robin Dunbar, British anthropologist – Dunbar's number
- John Duns Scotus, Scottish theologist – Dunce cap
- Guillaume Dupuytren, French physician – Dupuytren's contracture, Dupuytren's fracture
- August Dvorak, American psychologist – Dvorak keyboard layout

== E ==
- Jay Earley, American computer scientist – Earley parser
- Echo, Greek mythological character – echo
- Thomas Edison, American inventor – Edison and Swan Electric Light Company, Edison effect, Edison Gower-Bell Telephone Company of Europe, Ltd., Edison Hotel (Sunbury, Pennsylvania), Edison Illuminating Company, Edison Machine Works, Edison Manufacturing Company, Edison Ore-Milling Company, Edison Portland Cement Company, Edison Records, Edison screw, Edison Storage Battery Company, Edison Studios, Edison, Georgia, Edison, New Jersey, Edisonade, Edisonian approach, Edison–Lalande cell, Hotel Edison, Thomas A. Edison, Inc., Thomas Alva Edison silver dollar
- Prince Edward Augustus, Duke of Kent and Strathearn (younger brother of Kings George IV and William IV, and father of Queen Victoria), commander of British forces in Halifax, Nova Scotia – Prince Edward Island
- Edward VII, British king – Edwardian era
- Gustave Eiffel, French architect – Eiffel Tower
- Egeria, Roman mythological character – Egeria (female advisor), Egeria (plant)
- Albert Einstein, German mathematician and physicist – Einstein refrigerator, einsteinium, Bose–Einstein statistics, Bose–Einstein condensates, Einstein tensor
- David Eisenhower, American presidential relative – Camp David
- Dwight D. Eisenhower, American general and president – Eisenhower Doctrine, Eisenhower jacket
- Will Eisner, American comics artist – Eisner Award
- Biblical Elam, biblical character – Elam
- Electra, Greek mythological character – Electra complex
- Thomas Bruce, 7th Earl of Elgin, Scottish nobleman and art collector - Elginism.
- Elizabeth I, English queen, nicknamed the "Virgin Queen" and "Wingina", a Native American regional king – Virginia, West Virginia, Elizabethan sonnet, Elizabethan era, Elizabethan theatre, Elizabethan architecture, Elizabethan government
- Saint Elmo, Christian martyr – St. Elmo's fire
- Arpad Elo, Hungarian chess player – Elo rating system
- Loránd Eötvös, Hungarian physicist – eotvos, Lorándite, Eötvös effect, Eötvös number, Eötvös rule
- Epicurus, Greek philosopher – epicureanism, Epikoros
- Michael Anthony Epstein and Yvonne Barr, British physicians – Epstein–Barr virus
- Eratosthenes, Greek mathematician – Sieve of Eratosthenes
- Recep Tayyip Erdoğan, Turkish president – Erdoğanism
- Lars Magnus Ericsson, Swedish businessman – Ericsson
- Ériu, Irish mythological character – Éire
- Agner Krarup Erlang, Danish mathematician – Erlang, Erlang distribution, Erlang (programming language)
- Emil Erlenmeyer, German chemist – Erlenmeyer flask
- Eros, Greek mythological character – eroticism, erotomania, erotophobia
- Euclid, Greek mathematician – Euclidean geometry, Euclidean algorithm, Euclidean vector
- Eugene the Jeep - American comics character - jeep Further suggestions say it comes from the initials of the Ford version called the "Ford GPW".
- Euhemerus, Greek writer – euhemerism
- Leonhard Euler, Swiss mathematician – Euler's formula, Eulerian path, Euler equations; see also: List of topics named after Leonhard Euler
- Europa, Greek mythological character – Europe
- Bartolomeo Eustachi, Italian biologist – Eustachian tube
- Eutyches, Greek religious leader – eutychian
- William Davies Evans, Welsh-British chess player – Evans Gambit
- George Everest, Welsh explorer – Mount Everest
- Ewale a Mbedi, Cameroonian king – Duala people, Douala (from a variant of his name, Dwala)
- Edward Eyre, British explorer – Lake Eyre, Eyre Peninsula, Eyre Highway, Eyre Creek, Mount Eyre, Eyre Mountains (New Zealand)
- Abraham ibn Ezra, Jewish biblical commentator and philosopher – Abenezra (crater)

== F ==
- Quintus Fabius Maximus Verrucosus, Roman general – Fabian, Fabian Society, Fabianism, Fabian strategy
- Johannes Fabry, German physician – Fabry disease
- Carl Fabergé, Russian artist – Fabergé egg
- Fagin, British literary character – fagin (criminal who trains young thieves)
- Gabriel Fahrenheit, German physicist – the Fahrenheit scale
- Ernst Falkbeer, Austrian chess player – Falkbeer Countergambit
- Gabriele Falloppio, Italian physician – Fallopian tube
- Falstaff, British theatrical character – Fallstaffian (being fat, jolly and debauched)
- Guido Fanconi, Swiss physician – Fanconi syndrome, Fanconi anemia, Fanconi syndrome
- Michael Faraday, British physicist – farad, faraday – cgs unit of current Faraday constant, Faraday effect, Faraday's law of induction, Faraday's law of electrolysis
- Nigel Farage, British politician – Faragism
- Fatima, daughter of the Islamic prophet Muhammad – Fatimid
- Fauna, Roman mythological character – fauna
- Faust, German folklore character – Faustian, Faustian deal (a situation in which an ambitious person surrenders moral integrity to achieve power and success for a delimited term)
- Guy Fawkes, British criminal – guy
- Februus, Etruskian-Roman mythological character – February
- Federico Fellini, Italian film director – Fellinesque, Fellinian
- Pierre de Fermat, French mathematician – Fermat's Last Theorem, Fermat's little theorem, Fermat's principle, Fermat's factorization method
- Enrico Fermi, Italian physicist – fermions, Fermi energy, Fermilab, Fermi paradox, fermium – chemical element, Fermi–Dirac statistics fermi (obsolete name for femtometre)
- Enzo Ferrari, Italian businessman – Ferrari
- George Washington Gale Ferris Jr., American inventor – Ferris wheel
- Richard Feynman, American physicist – Feynman diagram
- Fiacre, Irish missionary – Fiacre
- Fib of the Picts, one of the seven sons of Cruthin – Fife
- Leonardo Fibonacci, Italian mathematician – Fibonacci Numbers
- Figaro, French theatrical character – figaro (a hairdresser and/or a cunning servant), figaro chain, Figaro
- Bill Finger, American comics writer – Bill Finger Award
- Bobby Fischer, American chess player – Fischer Defense
- Horace Fletcher, American diet guru – Fletcher technique, Fletcherizing (masticate repeatedly before swallowing nutrition)
- Matthew Flinders, British explorer – Flinders Bay, Flinders Chase National Park, Flinders Island, Flinders Park, South Australia, Flinders Ranges, Flinders River, Flinders Street railway station, Flinders University, Flinders, Victoria (Australia), Flinders bar, Flindersia
- Flora, Roman mythological character – flora, flower
- Pietro Paolo Floriani, Italian architect – Floriana, Floriana Lines
- Vladimir Fock, Russian physicist – Fock space, Fock state, Hartree-Fock method
- Jack Foley, American sound-effects artist – Foley, Foley artist, Foley effect
- Marie Angélique de Scorailles, Duchess of Fontanges, French courtesan – fontange (a type of haircut)
- B.C. Forbes, Scottish-American journalist – Forbes magazine
- Henry Ford, American businessman – Ford Motor Company
- Matthias N. Forney, American inventor – Forney locomotive
- William Forsyth, Scottish botanist – Forsythia
- Charles Fort, American writer – Forteana, Fortean Society, Fortean Times
- Pim Fortuyn, Dutch politician – Fortuynism
- Dick Fosbury, American athlete – Fosbury flop
- Henry Fourdrinier, British inventor - Fourdrinier machine.
- Charles Fourier, French philosopher – Fourierism
- Charles James Fox, British politician – Foxite
- William Fox, American film producer – 20th Century Fox
- James B. Francis, British-American civil engineer - Francis turbine.
- Francis of Assisi, Italian religious founder – San Francisco.
- Francisco Franco, Spanish general and president – Francoism
- Frankenstein's Monster, British literary character – Frankenstein (a monstrous creation that ruins its creator), Frankensteinian, frankenfood, Frankenstrat
- Benjamin Franklin, American inventor – Franklin stove, franklin, Ben Franklin effect.
- Franz Joseph I of Austria, Austrian-Hungarian emperor – Franz Josef Land
- Célestin Freinet, French pedagogue – Freinet education, Freinet classification
- Henry Flagg French, American agriculturalist - French drain
- Augustin Fresnel, French engineer, physicist and inventor – Fresnel lens
- Sigmund Freud, Austrian psychologist – Freudian, Freudian slip, Freudian psychology, Freudo-Marxism, Neo-Freudianism
- Robert Fripp, English musician – Frippertronics
- Friedrich Fröbel, German pedagogue – Froebel gifts, Fröbel school
- Fu Manchu, British literary character – Fu Manchu moustache
- Guido Fubini, Italian mathematician – Fubini's theorem
- Leonhart Fuchs, German botanist – Fuchsia
- Alberto Fujimori, Peruvian president – Fujimorism
- Tetsuya "Ted" Fujita, Japanese meteorologist – Fujita scale
- J. William Fulbright, American politician – Fulbright scholarship
- Buckminster Fuller, American inventor – Fullerene

== G ==
- Gabriel, Biblical character – Gabriel's Horn.
- Johan Gadolin, Finnish chemist and geologist – gadolinite, the mineral after which the chemical element gadolinium has been named.
- Matilda Joslyn Gage, American activist – Matilda effect
- Thomas Gage, British botanist – greengage
- Gaget, French businessman – Gaget, Gauthier & Cie, gadget
- Hugh Gaitskell, British politician – Gaitskellism
- Uziel Gal, Israeli inventor – the Uzi submachine gun
- Galen, Greek physician – galenical.
- Galileo Galilei, Italian astronomer – galileo or gal, unit of acceleration.
- Israel Galili, Israeli politician – the IMI Galil assault rifle
- Rory Gallagher, Irish pop musician – Gallagher shirt.
- George Gallup, American businessman – Gallup poll
- Luigi Galvani, Italian physician – galvanization
- James Gamble and William Procter – Procter & Gamble
- Sarah Gamp, British literary character – gamp
- Mahatma Gandhi, Indian activist – Gandhism, Gandhian economics, Gandhi cap
- Henry Laurence Gantt, American engineer – Gantt chart
- John Garand, Canadian-American inventor – M1 Garand rifle
- Alexander Garden, Scottish botanist – after whom the gardenia was named.
- Gargantua, French literary character – "gargantuan" (colossal, gigantic), Gargantua (solitaire)
- Giuseppe Garibaldi, Italian politician – Garibaldi biscuits, Italian aircraft carrier Giuseppe Garibaldi, Garibaldi shirt, Garibaldi (fish)
- Gideon Gartner, American businessman – Gartner
- Hermann Treschow Gartner, Danish surgeon and anatomist – Gartner's duct
- Marcus Garvey, Jamaican activist – Garveyism
- Martin Garzez, Maltese knight – Garzes Tower
- Béla Gáspár, Hungarian chemist - Gasparcolor
- Richard J. Gatling, American inventor – Gatling gun
- Charles de Gaulle, French general and president – Charles de Gaulle Airport, Gaullism
- Carl Friedrich Gauss, German mathematician – gauss – unit of magnetic induction, Gauss's law; see also: List of topics named after Carl Friedrich Gauss
- Enola Gay Tibbets, mother of Paul Tibbets, American pilot – Enola Gay
- Joseph Louis Gay-Lussac and Jacques Charles, French physicists and chemists – Law of Charles and Gay-Lussac
- Lou Gehrig, American baseball player – Lou Gehrig's disease
- Hans Geiger, German inventor – Geiger counter, Geiger–Müller tube
- Genius, Greek mythological character – genius, genie
- Gentius, Illyrian king – gentian
- George II, English king – Georgia (U.S. state)
- George V, British king – King George Street, King George Street, King George V Dock
- George VI, British king – George Cross, George Medal
- Henry George, American political economist – Georgism
- Saint George, Christian saint – Order of Saint George, Order of Saint Michael and Saint George, Saint George's Cross, Georgia, Saint George's, Grenada, and numerous other localities, churches and cathedrals
- Adrien de Gerlache, Belgian naval officer and explorer – Gerlachea, Pic de Gerlache, Mount Gerlache, Gerlache Strait, Gerlache Inlet, De Gerlache Seamounts, Gerlache Island, de Gerlache, Cape Gerlache.
- Sophie Germain, French mathematician – Sophie Germain prime
- Samuel German, English-American chocolate maker - German chocolate cake
- Hugo Gernsback, Luxembourgian-American publisher, inventor and writer – Hugo Award.
- Elbridge Gerry, American politician – gerrymandering
- Domingo Ghirardelli, American businessman – Ghirardelli Chocolate Company
- Gianduja, Italian theatrical character – Gianduja chocolate spread.
- Josiah Willard Gibbs, American chemist, mathematician and physicist – Gibbs free energy, Gibbs phenomenon
- Gideon, Biblical character – a "gideon".
- The Gigantes, Greek mythological characters – giant, gigantic
- Leonardo Gigli, Italian obstetrician – Gigli saw
- Saint Gilbert, English saint – Gilbertine
- Augustin Nicolas Gilbert, French physician – Gilbert's syndrome
- Thomas Gilbert, British sea captain – Kiribati.
- William S. Gilbert, British playwright – Gilbertian.
- Lillian Gilbreth, American Motion Studies expert – Therblig unit of movement (surname backwards more or less)
- King Camp Gillette, American inventor and businessman – Gillette
- Terry Gilliam, American animator and film director – Gilliamesque.
- Charles William Gilpin, American businessman – Gilpin Airlines
- William Gladstone, British Prime Minister – Gladstone bag, Gladstonian liberalism
- John Glas, Scottish religious leader – Glasite
- Johann Rudolf Glauber, German-Dutch chemist – Glauber's salt
- Gaston Glock, Austrian businessman and inventor – Glock and the Glock pistol
- Jehan Gobelin, French tapestry weaver – gobelin
- Kurt Gödel, Austrian-American mathematician – Gödel's incompleteness theorem, Gödel's ontological proof
- Godred Crovan, King of Dublin and the Isles – Crovan dynasty
- Mike Godwin, American writer – Godwin's law
- Godzilla, Japanese film monster – Godzilla roar (a soundbite which originated in the movies, but has become a recognizable stock sound effect on its own)
- Lamme Goedzak, Belgian literary character – "lamme goedzak" (Dutch expression to describe a "good, loveable, but naïve person, prone to being taken advantage of." The term is also used for obese, jolly people who enjoying eating and drinking.)
- Maria Goeppert-Mayer, Polish physicist – Goeppert-Mayer (GM) unit for the cross section of two-photon absorption
- Johann Wolfgang von Goethe, German poet, playwright, writer and scientist – Goethian, Goethite
- Marcel J.E. Golay, Swiss mathematician – Binary Golay code, Savitzky–Golay filter
- Rube Goldberg, American comics artist and cartoonist – Reuben Award, Rube Goldberg machine.
- Goldilocks, British fairy tale character – Goldilocks principle.
- Samuel Goldwyn, American film producer – Goldwyn Picture Corporation, later merged into Metro–Goldwyn–Mayer Inc. (or MGM), Goldwynism
- Goliath, Biblical character – "goliath", Goliath frog, Goliath birdeater, Goliath shrew
- Golliwog, American literary character – golliwog, golliwog doll.
- Franciscus Gomarus, Dutch theologist – gomarism.
- Luis de Góngora y Argote, Spanish poet – Gongorism
- Goofy, American cartoon character – Goofy holler
- Gordias, Greek mythological king – Gordian knot
- Alexander Gordon, Scottish nobleman – Gordon Setter
- Wilbert Gore, American businessman – Gore-Tex
- The Gorgons, Greek mythological characters – gorgonopsia, gorgonacea, gorgoneion
- Johannes Goropius Becanus, Dutch philosopher and physician – goropism
- Klement Gottwald, Czechoslovak politician – Zlín, a city in Moravia, the Czech Republic, was renamed Gottwaldov during 1949–1990.
- Regnier de Graaf, Dutch physician – Graafian follicle
- Thomas Gradgrind, British literary character – gradgrind
- Ernst Gräfenberg, German physician – Gräfenberg spot (G-spot)
- Sylvester Graham, American inventor – Graham crackers, Graham flour, Graham bread
- Thomas Graham, Scottish chemist – Graham's law
- James Granger, British writer – grangerise
- Marcel Grateau, French hairdresser – Marcelling, a Marcel haircut.
- Robert James Graves, Irish surgeon – Graves–Basedow disease
- Louis Harold Gray, British physicist – gray, unit of absorbed dose of radiation
- Gregory I, Italian pope – Gregorian music
- Gregory XIII, Italian pope – Gregorian calendar
- Richard Grenville-Temple, 2nd Earl Temple, British politician – Grenvillite
- Thomas Gresham, English merchant – Gresham's law
- Victor Grignard (1871–1935), French chemist – Grignard reagent and Grignard reaction
- Jacob and Wilhelm Grimm, German folklorists, storytellers and linguist – Grimm's law, Grimmification
- Henri Grob, Swiss chess player – Grob's Attack
- Homer Groening, father of Matt Groening, creator of The Simpsons – Homer Simpson, character in The Simpsons animated TV series
- Franz von Paula Gruithuisen, Bavarian physician and astronomer - Gruithuisen's lunar city (a clair-obscur/ trompe l'oeil effect on the moon's surface, north of crater Schröter, created by partially sunlit formations which have a somewhat artificial look).
- Ernst Grünfeld, Austrian chess player – Grünfeld Defence
- Vicente Guerrero, Mexican general – Guerrero
- Ché Guevara, Argentine revolutionary leader – Guevarism
- Guido of Arezzo, Italian musicologist – Guidonian hand, GUIDO music notation.
- Georges Guillain, French physician – Guillain–Barré syndrome
- Dr. Joseph Ignace Guillotin, French inventor – guillotine
- Henry C. Gunning, Canadian geologist – gunningite
- Robert John Lechmere Guppy, British biologist – guppy or guppie
- Louis Guttman, American psychologist and mathematician – Guttman scale

== H ==
- Fritz Haber, German chemist – Haber process
- Hadrian, Roman emperor – Hadrian's Wall and Hadrian's Wall Path
- Amber Hagerman, American kidnapping and murder victim – Amber alert
- Otto Hahn, German physicist – hahnium, chemical element. This element name is not accepted by IUPAC (See element naming controversy)
- Wilhelm Karl Ritter von Haidinger, Austrian mineralogist - Haidinger's brush
- Edwin Hall, American physicist – Hall effect
- Monty Hall, Canadian TV presenter – Monty Hall problem
- Edmond Halley, British astronomer – Halley's Comet
- Hugh Halligan, American police officer – Halligan bar
- Haman, Biblical figure – Hamantash
- Alexander Hamilton, American politician – Hamiltonianism
- Laurens Hammond, American inventor – Hammond organ
- Hamo, a 6th-century Saxon settler and landowner – Hampshire
- John Hancock, American politician– Since he signed the American Declaration of Independence his name became an eponym for "signature" in the U.S.A.
- Elliot Handler and Harold "Matt" Matson, American businesspeople – Mattel
- William Hanna and Joseph Barbera, American animators – Hanna-Barbera
- Gerhard Armauer Hansen, Norwegian physician – Hansen's disease
- Joseph Aloysius Hansom, British inventor – Hansom cab
- William S. Harley and Arthur Davidson, American businesspeople – Harley-Davidson
- Fletcher Harper, American publisher – Harper's Weekly
- Rodney Harrington, British literary and TV character – Harrington jacket
- David Harris (protester) – David's Album
- Charles Henry Harrod, British businessman – Harrods
- Alexis Hartmann, American paediatrician – Hartmann's solution
- Douglas Hartree, British mathematician – Hartree energy, Hartree equation, Hartree–Fock method
- Gerry Harvey and Ian Norman, Australian businesspeople – Harvey Norman
- Hashimoto Hakaru, Japanese physician – Hashimoto's thyroiditis
- Hassan-i-Sabah Persian religious leader – Hashshashin, assassin from hassansin (this etymology is disputed)
- Victor Hasselblad, Swedish photographer – Hasselblad, medium format photographic camera system
- Hawaii-loa, Polynesian chief who first led settlers to Hawaii – Hawaii
- Stephen Hawking, British astronomer and mathematician – Hawking radiation
- Paul Hawkins, British mathematician – Hawk-Eye tracking system used in cricket and other sports.
- Sadie Hawkins, American comics character – Sadie Hawkins dance, Sadie Hawkins Day
- Howard Hawks, American film director – Hawksian woman.
- Frank Hawthorne, Canadian mineralogist – Frankhawthorneite
- Haxtur, Spanish comics character – Haxtur Award
- Friedrich Hayek, Austrian economist – Hayekian economics
- Leonard Hayflick, American anatomist – Hayflick limit
- Will H. Hays, American film censor – Hays Code
- Oliver Heaviside, British physicist, and Arthur Edwin Kennelly, American physicist– Kennelly–Heaviside layer
- Heffalump, British literary character - heffalump trap.
- Henry Heimlich, American physician – Heimlich Maneuver
- Gerard Adriaan Heineken, Dutch beer brewer – Heineken
- Jimi Hendrix, American rock singer and guitarist – Hendrix riff
- John Henry, American folkloric character – John Henryism
- Joseph Henry, American physicist – henry, unit of inductance
- William Henry, British chemist – Henry's law
- James Curtis Hepburn, American translator – Hepburn romanization
- Herblock, American newspaper cartoonist – Herblock Prize
- Hercules, Greek mythological character – Herculean task
- Hergé, Belgian comics artist – "Hergéan" (comics in Hergé's graphic style, usually meaning the ligne claire)
- Hermaphroditus, Greek mythological character - hermaphrodite.
- Milton S. Hershey, American businessman – Hershey Company
- Heinrich Rudolf Hertz, German physicist – hertz, unit of frequency
- Ejnar Hertzsprung, Danish astronomer, and Henry Norris Russell, American astronomer – Hertzsprung–Russell diagram
- Theodor Herzl, Austro-Hungarian journalist and writer – Mount Herzl
- William Hewlett and David Packard, American businessmen – Hewlett-Packard
- Edward C. Heyde, American physician – Heyde's syndrome
- Miguel Hidalgo, Mexican priest and military leader – Hidalgo (state), Ciudad Hidalgo (Michoacán), Ciudad Hidalgo (Chiapas), Hidalgo (Texas).
- David Hilbert, German mathematician and physicist – Hilbert's program
- Paul von Hindenburg, German general and politician – Hindenburg airship
- Eugen von Hippel, German physician, and Arvid Lindau, Swedish physician – Von Hippel–Lindau disease
- Hippocrates, Greek physician – Hippocratic Oath
- Harald Hirschsprung, Danish physician – Hirschsprung's disease
- Alfred Hitchcock, British film director – Hitchcockian suspense, Hitchcock cameos (often used to refer to any cameo by a creator in his own work)
- Adolf Hitler, Austrian-German dictator – Hitlerite, Hitler salute, Hitler moustache, Hitlerjugend, Hitlerism, Anophthalmus hitleri beetle
- Thomas Hobbes, 17th century philosopher – Hobbes from "Calvin and Hobbes" comic strip
- Thomas Hobson, British stable manager and carrier– Hobson's choice
- Thomas Hodgkin, British physician – Hodgkin's disease, non-Hodgkin's lymphoma
- William Hogarth, British painter, illustrator and cartoonist – Hogarthian (artwork reminiscent of his trademark style, or satirical art that evokes a certain time period)
- Sherlock Holmes, British literary character – a "sherlock" (anyone who solves a mystery or a difficult problem. Sometimes also used in a sarcastic context, when something obvious has been pointed out.), Sherlockian game, a Sherlock Holmes hat (nickname for a deerstalker, Holmesian deduction)
- Soichiro Honda, Japanese businessman – Honda
- Mark Honeywell, American businessman – Honeywell
- Robin Hood, English folk hero – Robin Hood effect, Robin Hood Foundation, Robin Hood Flour, Robin Hood Hills, Robin Hood hat, Robin Hood index, Robin Hood Gardens, Robin Hood plan, Robin Hood tax, Robin Hood test, Robin Hood character (someone who steals money to give it to the poor or a criminal who becomes a folk hero), Robin of the Batman series
- Robert Hooke, British physicist – Hooke's law
- William Henry Hoover, American business man – The Hoover Company; in British English, the verb "hoover" means "to vacuum a floor" while the noun is the vacuum cleaner. The word "hoover" has also come to mean anything that is sucked up at a great rate ("They hoovered their way through the banquet")
- August Horch, German businessman – Horch and Audi carmakers (audi is Latin for I listen; horch has the same meaning in old German)
- Leslie Hore-Belisha, British politician – Belisha beacon
- James Horlick and William Horlick, British-American business people – Horlicks
- Shemp Howard, American actor and comedian – Fake Shemp
- William Howe, American architect and engineer – Howe truss bridges
- Enver Hoxha, Albanian president – Hoxhaism
- Hroc, an ancient landowner ("Hroc's fortress" + shire) – Roxburghshire
- Edwin Hubble, American astronomer – Hubble Space Telescope
- Henry Hudson, British explorer – Hudson Bay, Hudson River, Hudson Strait
- Howard Hughes, American aviator and businessman – Hughes Aircraft company, Howard Hughes Medical Institute, Hughes Airwest airlines, Hughes Glomar Explorer ship
- Howard R. Hughes Sr., American businessman – Hughes Tool Company, Baker Hughes company
- Alexander von Humboldt, German explorer – Humboldt Bay, Humboldt Current, Humboldt Falls, Humboldt Glacier, Humboldt lily, Humboldt Peak, Humboldt penguin, Humboldt Range, Humboldt River, Humboldt Sink, Humboldt squid, Pico Humboldt, Humboldt University of Berlin, Humboldt State University, Humboldtian science, Humboldt's hog-nosed skunk
- Gustáv Husák, Czechoslovak president – Husakism, Husák's Children
- Jan Hus, Czech priest – Hussites, Czechoslovak Hussite Church
- Hypnos, Greek mythological character – hypnosis.

== I ==
- Icarus, Greek mythological character – Icarus paradox
- Ignatz Mouse – American comics character – Ignatz Award
- Max Immelmann, German aviator – Immelmann turn, Immelmann loop
- Éleuthère Irénée du Pont, French-American businessman – DuPont
- Iris, Greek mythological character – Iris (anatomy)
- Otto Isakower, Austrian-American psychiatrist - Isakower phenomenon
- Italus, Roman/Greek mythological character – Italy.
- Iustitia, Roman mythological character – justice.

== J ==
- Andrew Jackson, American president – Jacksonian democracy
- Jacob (also known as Israel), Biblical character – Israel, Jacob's ladder (electricity), Jacob's ladder (knife), Jacob's ladder (manifold), Jacob's ladder (nautical), Jacob's Ladder (ropes course), Jacob's ladder (toy), Jacob's Ladder (piercing)
- Joseph Marie Jacquard, French inventor – Jacquard loom
- Candido Jacuzzi, Italian inventor – jacuzzi
- Gustav Jäger, German naturalist – Jaeger
- Maharajah Jai Singh, Indian maharajah – Jaipur
- Alfons Maria Jakob and Hans Gerhard Creutzfeldt, German physicians – Creutzfeldt–Jakob disease
- Saint James, Christian martyr – Santiago de Compostela, Santiago de Chile, Jacobin, in several languages (like French, German and Dutch) the word scallop is referred to as a "mussel/clam/shell/cockle of St. James".
- Thomas James, British-Welsh explorer – James Bay
- James, Duke of York, English king – New York City, New York State
- Calamity Jane, nickname of Martha Jane Canary, American frontierswoman and professional scout – Calamity James
- Cornelius Jansen, Flemish-Dutch theologian – Jansenism
- Karl Jansky, American astronomer – jansky, unit of flux density.
- Janus, Roman mythological character – January
- Robert Jarvik, American inventor – Jarvik artificial heart
- Javan, biblical character – Ionians
- Thomas Jefferson, American president – Jeffersonian, relating to Thomas Jefferson; more specifically, Jeffersonian architecture, Jeffersonian democracy; also, Jefferson Bible
- Jehovah, Biblical Deity – Jehovah's Witnesses
- Dr. Jekyll and Mr. Hyde, British literary character – a "Dr. Jekyll and Mr. Hyde" personality is used to describe a split personality
- Georges Jenny, French musician, poet, and electronic instrument builder — Jenny Ondioline
- Jeremiah, Biblical prophet – jeremiad
- Jeroboam, Israelian king – Jeroboam wine bottle
- Jessica Lunsford, American rape and murder victim – Jessica's Law
- Jiggs, American comics character – Jiggs dinner.
- Jip en Janneke, Dutch literary characters - Jip en Janneke language (simplistic language used by politicians to appeal to the lowest common demoniator).
- John of Austria, Austrian field marshal – Johannite
- John the Baptist, Biblical character – Order of Saint John, San Ġwann
- Tommy John, American baseball player – Tommy John surgery
- Jonah, Biblical character – Turkish yunus baligi (Jonas fish) for dolphins; Jonah, a sailor who brings bad luck
- The Joneses, American comics characters from Arthur R. "Pop" Momand's comic strip Keeping up with the Joneses – The idiom keeping up with the Joneses.
- Barry Jones, Australian activist and politician – Barry Jones Bay, Yalkaparidon jonesi.
- Edward Jones and Charles Dow, American businesspeople – Dow Jones & Company
- Joseph II, Austrian-Hungarian emperor – Josephinism
- Brian David Josephson, Welsh physicist – Josephson junction, Josephson effect
- James Prescott Joule, British physicist – joule
- Judah, Biblical character (Hebrew: יהודה, Yehuda) – Bnei Yehuda Tel Aviv F.C., Kingdom of Judah
- Judas Iscariot, Biblical character – A "judas" (a traitor).
- Julian the Hospitaller, Christian martyr – St. Julian's, St. Julian's Tower, various locations named "San Julián"
- Julius of Caerleon, Christian martyr – St Julians, Newport
- Juno, Roman mythological character – June
- Jupiter, Roman mythological character – jovial, jovian, Jovian system
- Justinian I, Byzantine king – Codex Justinianeus

== K ==
- János Kádár, Hungarian president – Kadarism
- Franz Kafka, Czech-German author – Kafkaesque, Kafkaesque bureaucracy, Kafkaseque situation.
- Meir Kahane, American-Israeli activist – Kahanism
- Mikhail Kalashnikov, Russian gun inventor – the Avtomat Kalashnikova series of weapons, including the AK-47, the Kalashnikov Handheld Machine Gun or Ruchnoi Pulemet Kalashnikova obraztsa 1974 g (RPK-74)
- Ingvar Kamprad, Swedish businessman – the first two letters of IKEA
- Victor Kandinsky, Russian physician – Kandinsky–Clérambault syndrome
- Gaetano Kanizsa, Italian psychologist – Kanizsa triangle
- Megan Kanka, American rape and murder victim – Megan's Law
- Moritz Kaposi, Hungarian dermatologist – Kaposi's sarcoma
- D. R. Kaprekar, Indian mathematician – Kaprekar constant, Kaprekar number
- Jacobus Kapteyn, Dutch astronomer – Kapteyn's Star
- Anna Karenina, Russian literary character – Anna Karenina principle
- Theodore von Kármán, Hungarian mathematician – Kármán line, von Kármán constant, von Kármán ogive, Kármán vortex street
- Tadao Kashio, Japanese businessman – Casio
- Yevgeny Kaspersky, Russian computer scientist and businessman – Kaspersky Lab, Kaspersky Anti-Virus
- Túpac Katari, Bolivian resistance leader – Katarismo
- Shozo Kawasaki, Japanese businessman – Kawasaki Heavy Industries
- Tomisaku Kawasaki, Japanese physician – Kawasaki disease
- Ryan Keenan, Amy Barger, Lennox Cowie, astronomers - KBC Void (Keenan-Barger-Cowie Void, an immense empty region of space)
- Grace Kelly, American actress – Kelly bag
- Lord Kelvin, Irish-British physicist – kelvin (unit of thermodynamic temperature)
- John F. Kennedy, American president – John F. Kennedy International Airport, John F. Kennedy Center for the Performing Arts, Kennedy Center Honors, John F. Kennedy University, Kennedy Doctrine
- Arthur E. Kennelly, American physicist, and Oliver Heaviside, British physicist – Kennelly–Heaviside layer
- Johannes Kepler, German astronomer – Kepler's laws of planetary motion, Kepler conjecture
- Paul Keres, Estonian chess player – Keres Defence
- H. F. A. Kern, Dutch observer of sky phenomena - Kern arc (a very rare halo phenomenon, probably the complete annular appearance of the Circumzenithal arc)
- Brian Kernighan, Canadian computer scientist – the third letter of the name AWK, a computer pattern/action language, is taken from his last name.
- John Kerr, Scottish physicist – Kerr effect
- John Maynard Keynes, British economist – Keynesian economics
- Nikita Khrushchev, Russian head of state – Khrushchevism, Khrushchev dough, Khrushchyovka
- Wilhelm Killing, German mathematician – Killing vector field
- Petrus Jacobus Kipp, Dutch chemist – Kipp apparatus
- Jack Kirby, American comics artist – Kirby dots
- Gustav Kirchhoff, German physicist – Kirchhoff's Laws
- Néstor Kirchner, Argentine president – Kirchnerism
- Herbert Kitchener, 1st Earl Kitchener, British general – Kitchener bun
- Lawrence Klein, American curator – Klein Award
- Sebastian Kneipp, German priest – Kneipp cure.
- Diedrich Knickerbocker, American literary character – knickerbockers
- Donald Knuth, American computer scientist – Knuth–Morris–Pratt algorithm
- Ed Koch, American politician – Ed Koch Queensboro Bridge
- Helge von Koch, Swedish mathematician – Koch snowflake.
- Robert Koch, German physician – Koch's postulates
- Ludwig Ritter von Köchel, Austrian musicologist – Köchel catalogue, K-numbers.
- Zoltán Kodály, Hungarian composer – Kodály method
- Simon bar Kokhba, Jewish resistance leader – Bar Kokhba game (Hungarian game)
- Alexander Konstantinopolsky, Ukrainian-Russian chess player – Konstantinopolsky Opening
- Abraham Isaac Kook, Russian rabbi – Mossad Harav Kook
- Wladimir Köppen, Russian-German meteorologist – Köppen climate classification
- Kazimierz Kordylewski, Polish astronomer - Kordylewski cloud
- Sergei Korsakoff, Russian psychologist – Korsakoff's syndrome
- Aharon Kotler, Belarusian rabbi – Ramat Aharon
- Alfried Krupp, German businessman – Krupp, now ThyssenKrupp
- Stanley Kubrick, American film director - Kubrickian, Kubrick stare
- Gerard Kuiper, Dutch astronomer – Kuiper belt
- August Kundt, German physicist – Kundt's tube
- Harvey Kurtzman, American comics artist – Harvey Award
- Kyi, Kyivan legendary founder – Kyiv

== See also ==
- Lists of etymologies
- List of eponymous adjectives in English
- List of eponymous laws
- List of places named after people
- List of astronomical objects named after people
- List of stars named after people
- List of toponyms
