= Catherine wheel =

Catherine wheel may refer to:

- Breaking wheel, an instrument of torturous execution originally associated with Catherine of Alexandria
- Catherine wheel (firework), a firework that rotates when lit

== Arts and entertainment ==
- Catherine Wheel (band), 1990s British alternative rock band
- The Catherine Wheel, a 1981 dance by Twyla Tharp, with music by David Byrne, filmed by the BBC in 1983
  - The Catherine Wheel (album), a 1981 recording of David Byrne's musical score commissioned by Twyla Tharp for the dance
- "Catherine Wheels", a song by Crowded House from the 1993 album Together Alone
- "Catherine Wheel", a song by Dieselboy/Skynet from the 2006 album The Human Resource
- "Catherine Wheel", a song by Megan Washington from the 2020 album Batflowers
- "Katherine Wheel", a song by HIM from the 2010 album Screamworks: Love in Theory and Practice
- "St. Catherine's Wheel", a song by Lamb of God from the 2026 album Into Oblivion
- "Catherine Wheel", a song by Emma Ruth Rundle from the 2026 album These Killing Times
- The Catherine Wheel, a 1949 crime novel by Patricia Wentworth
- The Catherine Wheel (novel), a 1952 novel by Jean Stafford

== Other uses ==
- Catherine wheel (window), a type of spoked circular window
- Catherine-wheel pincushion (Leucospermum catherinae), a flowering evergreen
- Messier 99, a spiral galaxy that is also known as St. Catherine's Wheel

== See also ==
- Pinwheel (disambiguation)
