= Sarrá family =

- Current region: Cuba
- Origin: Catalonia, Spain
- Founder: José Sarra Català
- Connected members: Fanjul family
- Dissolution: 1959

The Sarrá family was a prominent family in Cuba. They founded Droguería Sarrá, which was the second largest pharmacy in the world at the time.

== History ==
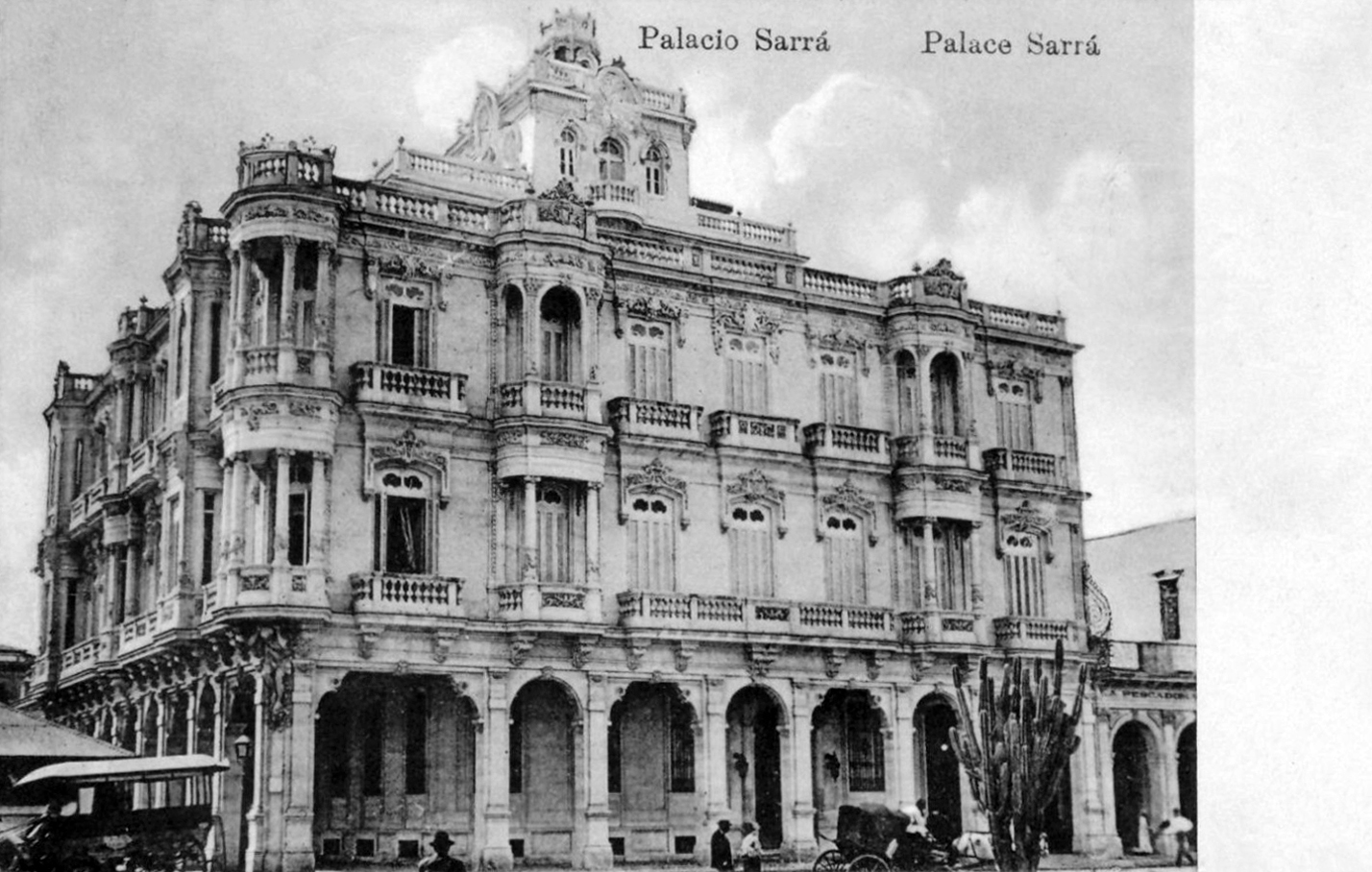
One of the Sarrá families residences

José Sarra Català, originally from Catalonia, Spain, arrived in Cuba in the early 19th century. Trained as a pharmacist, he founded Droguería Sarra in Old Havana during a period of rapid economic and infrastructural growth in the city. Sarra's model combined apothecary services with wholesale and importation of European medicines, chemicals, and cosmetic goods.

By the early 20th century, under the direction of José Sarra's descendants, the pharmacy had expanded into a large-scale pharmaceutical and retail conglomerate, operating out of an architecturally renowned building on the corner of Teniente Rey and Compostela streets.

The Sarra family rose to become one of the most affluent and socially influential families in pre-revolutionary Cuba. Their fortune derived not only from the pharmacy but also from real estate holdings, investments in sugar production, and shares in Havana's emerging industrial and financial sectors.

By the 1940s, the Sarra family was often mentioned in Havana's elite social circles alongside families like the Bacardís and the Fanjuls. Several family members held degrees from European universities and maintained residences in Paris, Madrid, and New York, while preserving deep ties to Cuban civic and charitable institutions.

In addition to private homes, the Sarras were patrons of architecture and contributed funds to the construction of clinics, schools, and churches, often with their family crest displayed prominently. In 1917, Ernesto Sarrá commissioned and gifted Castillo de Averhoff, a lavish estate built in Arroyo Naranjo, Havana, as a wedding gift to his daughter Celia Sarrá when she married Octavio Averhoff, who later became rector of the University of Havana and minister during Machado's era.

Castillo de Averhoff

Following the Cuban Revolution in 1959, the Sarra family's businesses and homes were nationalized by the revolutionary government. Droguería Sarra was converted into a state-run pharmacy, though the historic building still bears the original signage and architectural elements. The Sarra family fled to the United States and Europe, and many descendants went on to successful careers in medicine, chemistry, and business abroad.

Today, the former Sarra Pharmacy building is a national heritage site. It remains a symbol of both Cuban innovation in pharmaceutical practice and the complex legacies of wealth and exile that characterize much of Cuban history. Sarra's Palacio Velasco-Sarrá, built in 1912 for a family member, remains a landmark and now serves as the Embassy of Spain in Havana.

== Droguería Sarrá ==
The business began as La Reunión, founded in 1853 by Valentín Català Pradell, José Sarra Català, José Sarra Valldejulí (his nephew), and Antonio González López. After the deaths or retirements of the other partners, José Sarra Valldejulí became the sole owner and mastermind behind its transformation into Droguería Sarra.

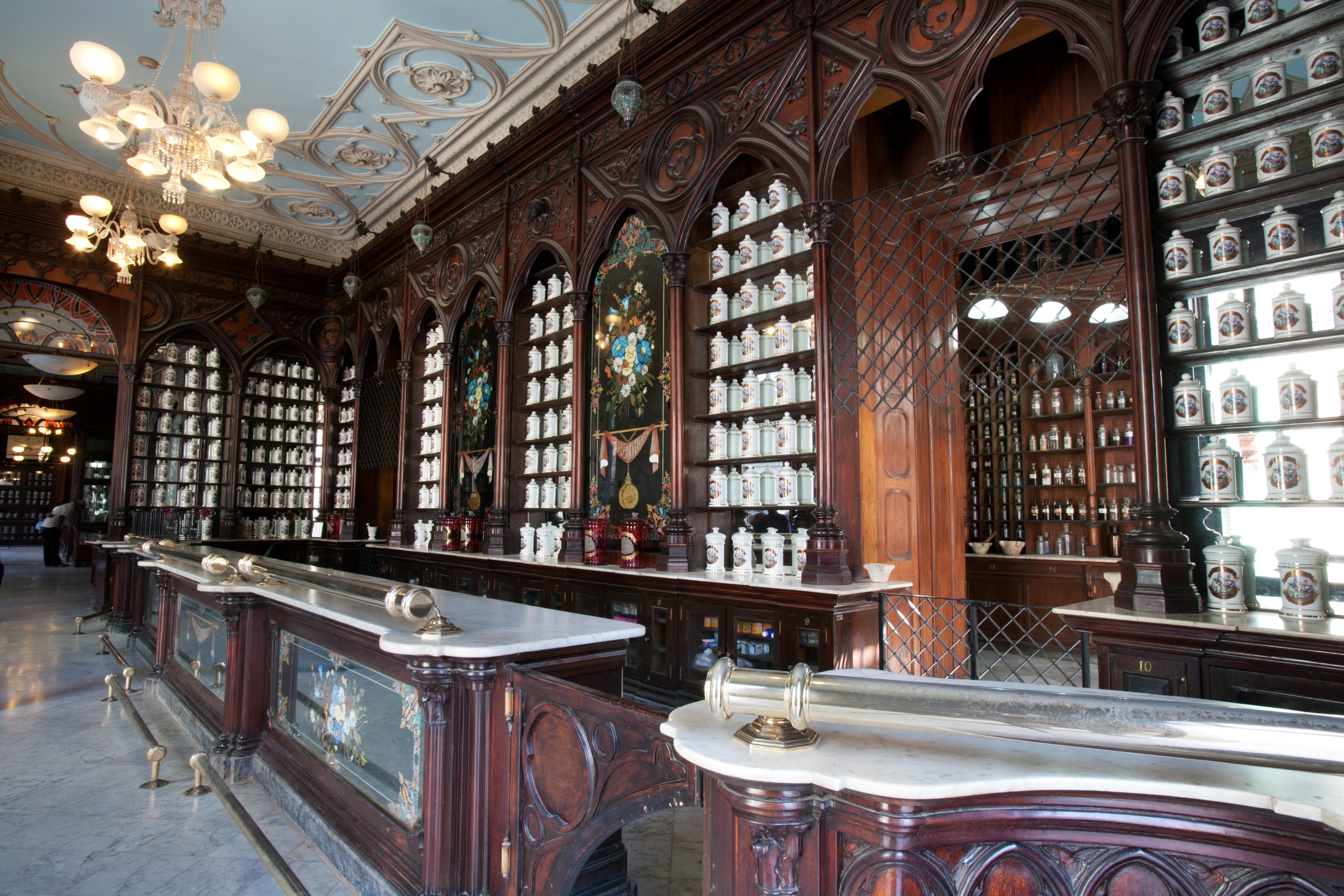
Old Sarrá pharmacy

Under Sarra Valldejulí's leadership, the pharmacy was remodeled in the 1870s, featuring neoclassical architectural flourishes, imported stained glass, Italian marble, and carved wood cabinetry. The company began producing its own branded medicines, the most famous of which was Magnesia Sarrá, a digestive powder that became a household staple across Cuba and was exported abroad. In 1878, King Alfonso XII of Spain granted José Sarra Valldejulí the title of "Pharmacist to the Royal House", and the business was allowed to display the Spanish Royal Coat of Arms on its packaging. By the turn of the 20th century, the company had wholesale distribution channels, its own in-house laboratories, and factories producing a wide variety of chemical, cosmetic, and medicinal products.

José Sarra's son, Ernesto Sarrá Hernández, inherited the business and led its greatest expansion in the early 20th century.

By the 1930s the company had 46 buildings in the heart of Havana, It employed over 600 people, It offered over 500 proprietary products, and the complex spanned an entire city block bordered by Teniente Rey, Compostela, Muralla, and Habana streets.

The Cuban Congress in 1934 authorized the use of the Republic's national coat of arms on Sarra products, further legitimizing its elite standing.

In the early 2000s, the Cuban government began restoring the building to its original state, recognizing its architectural and cultural significance. In 2004, the Museo de la Farmacia Habanera was inaugurated, recreating the original layout and aesthetic of the 19th-century pharmacy.

== Family tree ==
Josep Sarrà Català (1818–1877) m. Emilia Adria Serra Ramón Sarrá Catalá (1807–1854) m. Teresa Valldejulí Beltrán
  - José Pablo Félix Sarrá y Valldejulí (1839–1898) m. Cecilia Josefina Emilia Hernandez y Bucho
    - Ernesto José Sarrá y Hernández (1874–1960) m. Dolores 'Loló' Larrea y Piña
      - Ernestina Sarrá y Larrea (1909–1995) m. Thorvald Sánchez y Culmell (1st cousin of Anaïs Nin)
        - Thorvald Ernest Sanchez y Sarrá Jr. (1933–2017)
        - Hilda Dolores Sánchez y Sarrá m. Juan Francisco Montalvo
          - Juan F. Montalvo Jr. m. Margaret Fanjul Montalvo (member of the Fanjul family
      - Hilda Sarrá y Larrea
      - Ofelia Sarrá y Larrea
    - María Teresa Sarrá Hernández (1879–1918) m. Dionisio Velasco Gonzalez de Castilla
    - Celia Maria Vitalia Sarrá y Hernández (1887–1961) m. Octavio Prudencio Averhoff Y Pla
