= George's Dock (disambiguation) =

George's Dock was a dock in Liverpool, England.

George's Dock may also refer to:

- George's Dock, Dublin, Ireland

== See also ==
- King George V Dock (disambiguation)
