= Pinwheel =

Pinwheel may refer to:

- Pinwheel (toy), a spinning children's toy
- Pinwheel (cryptography), a device for producing a short pseudo-random sequence of bits
- Pinwheel (shogi), an opening in the game shogi or Japanese chess
- Pinwheel (TV channel), a channel which would later turn into Nickelodeon
- Pinwheel (TV series), a children's show on Nickelodeon that ran from 1977 to 1984
- Pinwheel calculator (part of), a type of early mechanical arithmetic machine
- Pinwheel escapement, part of a mechanical clock
- Tabernaemontana divaricata, also known as pinwheel flower
- Pinwheel scheduling, problem of devising a rotating sequence of tasks with given frequencies
- Pinwheel tilings, aperiodic tilings of the plane whose tiles appear in infinitely many orientations
- Catherine wheel (firework), a form of pyrotechnic display device also known as a pinwheel
- Coenocharopa elegans, also known as the elegant pinwheel snail, a land snail found in Queensland, Australia
- "Pinwheels", a poem by Patti Smith from her 1978 book Babel
- Pinwheel USY, part of United Synagogue Youth covering the Pacific Northwest
- Wartenberg wheel, a neurological medical device

== See also ==
- Pinwheel Galaxy (disambiguation)
