= Egyptian days =

Days thought to be unlucky

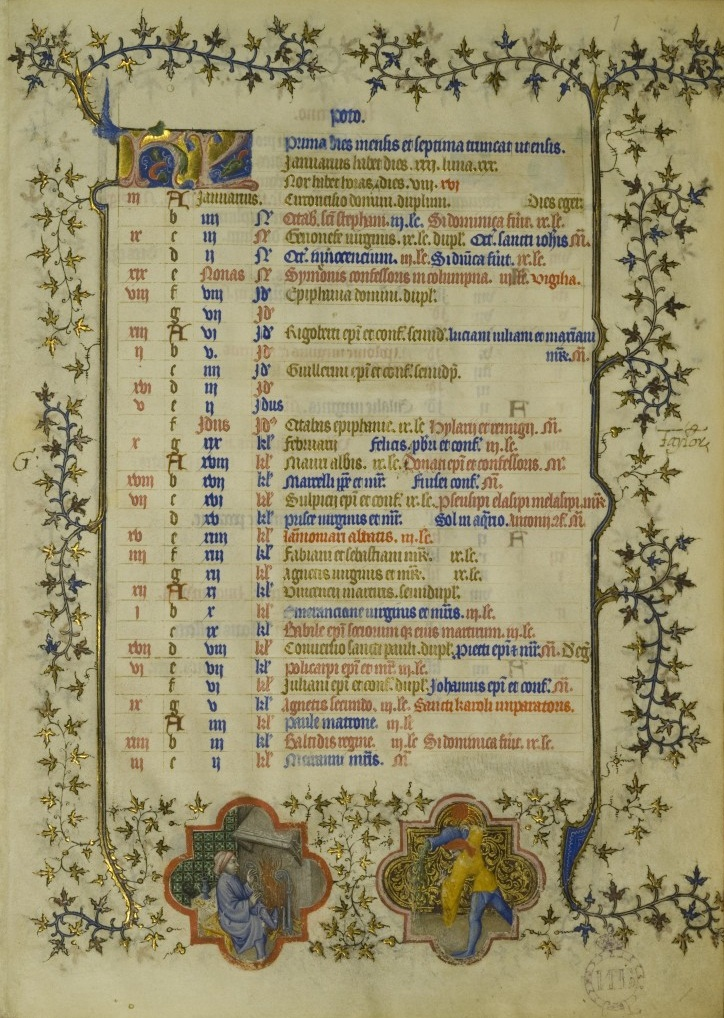
Late 14th-century Calendarium Parisiense. Egyptian days are marked dies eger.

During the Middle Ages in Europe, Egyptian days (Latin: dies Ægyptiaci) were certain days of the year held to be unlucky. The Egyptian days were:

- January 1, 25
- February 4, 26
- March 1, 28
- April 10, 20
- May 3, 25
- June 10, 16
- July 13, 22
- August 1, 30
- September 3, 21
- October 3, 22
- November 5, 28
- December 7, 22

These were days considered unlucky to begin any enterprise. Physicians were especially discouraged from performing bloodletting on the Egyptian days.

== See also ==
- Tycho Brahe days – Days judged to be especially unlucky
- Intercalary month (Egypt) – Calendar day outside any regular month

== Bibliography ==
- Stuart, Heather (1979). "A Ninth Century Account of Diets and Dies aegyptiaci". Scriptorium. 33 (2): 237–244. doi:10.3406/scrip.1979.1138. PMID 11610743.
- Quinion, Michael (3 March 2007). "World Wide Words: Egyptian Days".
- Schmitz, Wilhelm (1867). "Ein Wolfenbütteler Verzeichnitz Der Dies Aegyptiaci". Rheinisches Museum für Philologie. 22: 303–306. JSTOR 23078686.
- Skemer, Don C. (2010). "Armis Gunfe: Remembering Egyptian Days". Traditio. 65: 75–106. doi:10.1353/trd.2010.0005. S2CID 144175804.
- Steele, Robert (1919). "Dies Aegyptiaci". Proceedings of the Royal Society of Medicine. 12 (Suppl): 108–121. PMC 2067117. PMID 19980815.
