= Cyprianus (collection of spells) =

Scandinavian folk magic texts

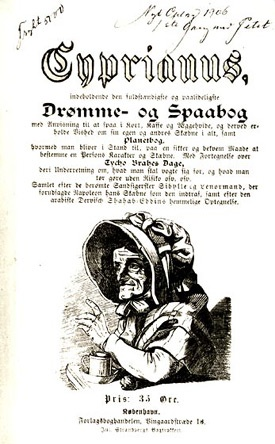
This published Cyprianus from 1916 calls itself a "dream and fortunetelling book", and it also promises an astrological almanac from Tycho Brahe.

Cyprianus is a name given in Scandinavian traditions of folk magic to the "black book" ("Svarteboken"): a grimoire or manuscript collection of spells; and by extension to the magical tradition that these spells form a part of. There is no standard text called "Cyprianus"; it was a general label given to a collection of spells.

Manuscripts called or referring to Cyprianus had a dark reputation; in some versions, one obtained the text by renouncing one's baptism and devoting oneself to Satan. The common people's opinion of the book was that it was a standard grimoire concerned with the summoning of demons and spirits. Ministers were often thought to have obtained it through their studies at university; it is not coincidence that ministers' wives often functioned as folk healers in rural communities. Like many such texts, it was said to be bound to its owner and hard to get rid of; it was claimed that these texts will not burn nor be destroyed by water, and attempting to discard them will only result in their supernatural return. These compilations nevertheless were widely circulated among the cunning folk of Scandinavia, who in a rural land with few physicians were the folk healers sought out by ordinary people beset by injury or illness.

== Cyprianus ==
"Cyprianus" is the name frequently given to the compiler or author of the spells contained in the tradition. A variety of stories are told concerning the identity of this Cyprianus.

Saint Cyprian of Antioch was a bishop and martyr in early Christianity. In the Middle Ages, a variety of legends attached to his name, including a tradition that he practiced magic before his conversion, and as such was the author of a magical textbook. In another medieval tradition, Cyprianus was a sorcerer who sought to seduce St. Justina, but was foiled and converted when she made the sign of the cross and he followed suit, freeing himself from the power of the devil. The sorcerer and the historical bishop were likely conflated in later legend. The Black Books of Elverum claim to be a summary of a Cyprianus by a "Bishop Johannes Sell" from Oxford, England in 1682. The British bishop John Fell may be the person who is meant here; Fell did publish an edition of the works of St. Cyprian.

The actual stories told of Cyprianus in Scandinavia often made no reference to St. Cyprian. Some made Cyprianus into a typical Faust figure; some said that Cyprianus was a wicked Norwegian or Dane who learned magic through his dealings with the Devil; one version makes Cyprianus so evil that the Devil threw him out of Hell; Cyprianus wrote the text to have his revenge. A different and strongly contradictory version explains that Cyprianus was a student who discovered he was attending a diabolical "black school", and wrote the text to explain how to undo all the witchcraft he learned there.

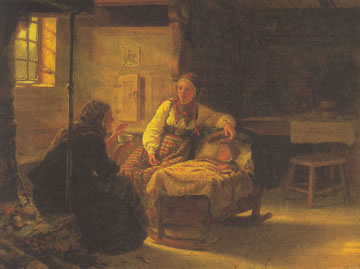
En Signekjerring, an 1848 painting by Adolph Tidemand. The elderly woman is performing the støyping divination ritual to seek the cause of the child's illness.

An anachronistic tale told in the printed Danish spell collection Oldtidens Sortebog ("Old Time Magic Book") makes Cyprianus to have been a pious and beautiful Mexican nun from the fourteenth century. In a gothic tale, Oldtidens Sortebog has Cyprianus cast into a dungeon in 1351. While imprisoned in the dungeon, Cyprianus rends her clothing and commits her magical knowledge to the rags, written in her own blood. Her text was then found in an old castle.

== The spells ==
The spells in the Cyprianus tradition are typical Germanic folk magic: a mixed bag of folk remedies, prayers, and actual magic. They resemble the spells of the German language Braucherei, "pow-wow", and The Long Lost Friend traditions. One typical spell to heal a sprained ankle went:

Jesus rei over ei hei
Fållån snåva og foten vrei
Jesus steig av og la foten an
som den tilforn var
i namnet Gud, Fader, Sønn, og Helligånd

"Jesus rode over a stony plain.
His horse stumbled, its leg it did sprain.
Jesus dismounted to cure the pain
And made the injury good again.
In the name of God the Father, Son, and Holy Ghost."

The methods of contagion and transference are in use here; a sacred personage in an apocryphal story is confronted with a problem similar to that faced by the actual sufferer, who avails himself of their supernatural aid.

An important aspect of the magical tradition was the performance of divination, often by pouring molten lead through a hole in a piece of flatbread into cold water, a practice called støyping ("molybdomancy"). Lead scraped from the windows of churches was often used for this purpose. This was done to divine the cause of rickets, which was often thought to be the result of a changeling, a huldrabarn or bytting, left in the place of a healthy child by the malicious huldra-folk. The diviner in this ritual was called a signekjerring, a "blessing crone".

== Inexperienced use of the Black Book ==
The Inexperienced Use of the Black Book is a motif in Scandinavian folklore. In such legends, a servant, maid or someone else unexpectedly happens to find and read the Black Book, thus summoning the devil, while the owner, often a clergyman, is away. The only way to save oneself is to give the devil a task that he cannot solve: to empty a fjord, to untie all knots in a fishing net, to twist a rope of sand, to row against the wind with a boat filled with empty buckets, etc.. The devil is then kept busy until the expert or the owner of the book returns and exorcises the devil away. It is given an ML (Migratory Legend) number of 3020 and is related to Aarne-Thompson type 325, "Apprentice and Ghost" and type 565, "The Magic Mill".

== See also ==
- Book of Saint Cyprian
- Galdrabók
- Hoodoo
- Merseburg charms
- Sixth and Seventh Books of Moses
- Tycho Brahe days
