= Tycho Brahe days =

Days judged to be especially unlucky

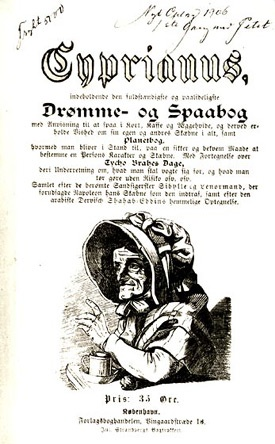
This printed Cyprianus (Copenhagen, 1916) promises the list of Tycho Brahe Days.

In the folklore of Scandinavia, Tycho Brahe days (Danish: Tycho Brahes-dage; Norwegian: Tycho Brahedager; Swedish: Tycho Brahe-dagar) are days judged to be especially unlucky, especially for magical work, and important business transactions (and personal events). Tycho Brahe (1546–1601) was a Danish astronomer, astrologer, and alchemist and as such achieved some acclaim in popular folklore as a sage and magician.

== Origins ==
The idea that certain calendar dates are lucky or unlucky is of ancient origin, going back as far as the Mesopotamian civilizations. Tables that identify lucky and unlucky days are sometimes known by their German category name Tagwählerei.

- The Coligny calendar identifies certain calendar dates as lucky (mat) or unlucky (anmat).
- The Roman calendar marks many days and parts of others as dies nefasti, religiously unsuitable for the conduct of public business.
- Contemporary North America has a tradition that Friday the 13th is an unlucky day. It has been called a "pervasive form of divination" that "is found in all [current] societies which regulate their days and nights in [the conventional modern] calendric system[~~s~~]".

The received idea concerning the origin of Tycho Brahe days was that

"Tycho Brahe, the celebrated Danish astronomer of the sixteenth and seventeenth centuries, was very superstitious, considering certain days in the year pregnant with misfortune, wherefore in Denmark, up to this very day, the laboring class call such days on which they happen to meet with some unfortunate accident, Tycho Brahe's days."

In his travelogue A Poet's Bazaar, Hans Christian Andersen alludes to Tycho Brahe's death while living in exile, in Prague, observing that

"Denmark owns not even his dust; but the Danes mention his name in their bad times, as if a denunciation proceeded out of it: These are 'Tycho Brahe's days!' they say."

Although no mention of the days now called Tycho Brahe days is actually found in any work of Tycho Brahe, they are still frequently referenced in almanacs and recur in Scandinavian folklore. In the Cyprianus tradition, Tycho Brahe days are considered unlucky for magical work; several of the spells in the Black Books of Elverum note that they should not be carried out on a Tycho Brahe day.

== Days ==
Based on the Julian calendar

- January 1, 2, 4, 6, 11, 12, 29
- February 11, 17, 18
- March 1, 4, 14, 15
- April 9, 16, 17, 18, 19, 22, 29
- May 10, 17, 18
- June 6
- July 17, 21
- August 20, 21
- September 16, 18
- October 6
- November 6, 18
- December 6, 11, 18

These days were supposed to be unlucky to perform tasks such as getting married, starting a journey, or to fall ill on. Some versions claim that Tycho Brahe also identified several days as particularly lucky:

- January 26
- February 9 and 10
- June 15

Some lists omit certain days, or add others; there is no standard list. Denmark was on the Julian calendar until 1700, when it switched to the Gregorian calendar.

== See also ==
- Egyptian days
- Friday the 13th
