= Jeffersonian =

Jeffersonian refers to several fields upon which the U.S. President Thomas Jefferson had an impact:

- Jeffersonian architecture
- Jeffersonian democracy
- Jeffersonian Bible
- The Democratic-Republican Party were called Jeffersonians, among many other names

Jeffersonian or The Jeffersonian may also refer to:

In fiction:

- The Jeffersonian Institute, a fictional research institution in the US television program Bones, based on the real Smithsonian Institution

In transportation:

- The Jeffersonian (train), a train operated by the Pennsylvania Railroad

In publications:

- The Jeffersonian (newspaper) (1907-1965), a newspaper in Jeffersontown, Kentucky
- The Daily Jeffersonian, a newspaper in Cambridge, Ohio

== See also ==
- Jefferson (disambiguation)
- Jeffersonia, a genus of flowering plants
