= Satchmo's syndrome =

Satchmo's syndrome is a disorder due to the rupture of orbicularis oris muscle in trumpet players. This syndrome is named after the nickname of Louis Armstrong, the trumpet player from New Orleans, because apparently it fits with the symptoms he experienced in 1935.

== Pathology ==
In order to produce the right music, the trumpet player has to exert strength and produce vibrations of the lip. This can sometimes lead to the rupture of the musculature of the lip. Due to the muscle rupture, there is possibly a lengthening of the circumference of the orbicularis oris, and it fails to exert normal strength. As a result, the trumpet player cannot produce high musical notes. This condition may be partly reversed by resting the lips for weeks to months. The muscle rupture can also be corrected surgically, in which case the trumpet player can perform as well as they did before the injury.
