= Bacardi cocktail =

Cocktail made primarily with Bacardi Superior

Bacardi Cocktail
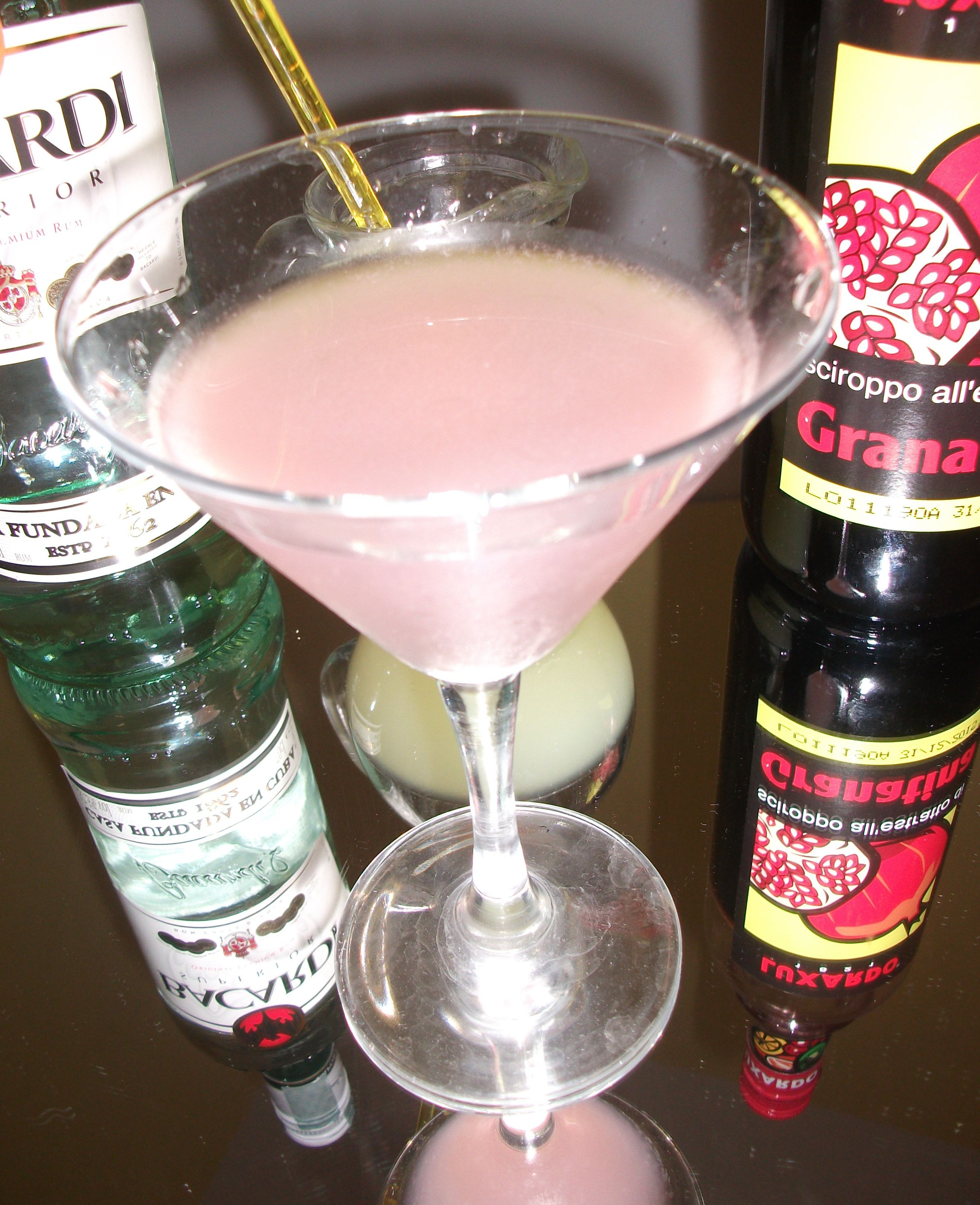
- Type: Cocktail
- Ingredients: 4.5 cl white rum; 2 cl lime juice; 1 cl grenadine syrup
- Website: iba-world.com/iba-cocktails/
- Standard drinkware: Cocktail glass
- Standard garnish: Lime
- Served: Straight up: chilled, without ice
- Preparation: Shake together with ice. Strain into glass and serve

The Bacardi cocktail is a cocktail made primarily with Bacardi Superior. It is served as a "pre-dinner" cocktail.

== History ==
The Bacardí Cocktail was originally the same as the daiquiri, containing rum, lime juice, and sugar; The Grenadine version of the Bacardí Cocktail originated in the US, while the original non-red Bacardí company recipe originated from Cuba.

On 28 April 1936, the New York Supreme Court ruled that the drink must contain Bacardí rum to be called a Bacardí cocktail.

== See also ==
- List of cocktails
