= Bacardi Superior =

White rum made by the Bacardi Company

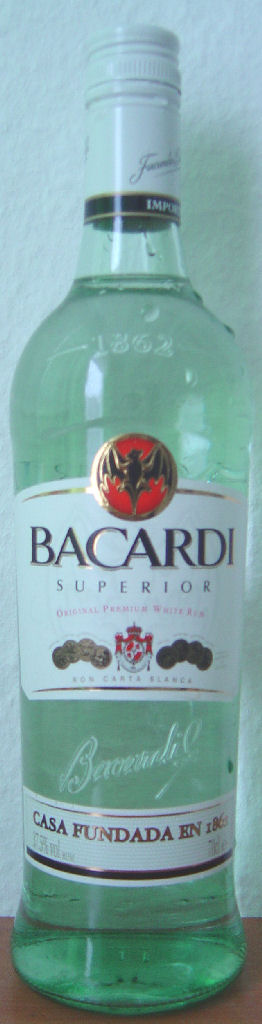
Bacardi Superior bottle

Bacardi Superior is a white rum made by the Bacardi Company. In the US it is bottled at 80 proof (40% abv) and at 75 proof (37.5% abv) in the UK and Continental Europe. This rum is mostly used to make cocktails calling for a white rum such as Cuba Libre, Daiquiri, Piña Colada, Mojito, and Bacardi cocktail.

== Other Bacardi products ==
Aged rums

- Bacardi Oro (Gold)
- Bacardi Black
- Bacardi 151
- Bacardi Añejo
- Bacardi 8

Flavored rums

- Bacardi Limón – lemon flavored
- Bacardi Peach Red – peach flavored
- Bacardi Razz – raspberry flavored
- Bacardi O – orange flavored
- Bacardi Big Apple – apple flavored
- Bacardi Grand Melon – watermelon flavored
- Bacardi Banana - banana flavored
- Bacardi Cóco – coconut flavored
- Bacardi Dragon Berry – strawberry flavored, infused with dragon fruit

Discontinued flavors

- Bacardi Vaníla – vanilla flavored

== See also ==
- List of Puerto Rican rums
