= Gradgrind =

Term from a character in Dickens's Hard Times

Illustrated by Harry Furniss in a 1910 edition of Hard Times

Thomas Gradgrind is the notorious school board Superintendent in Dickens's 1854 novel Hard Times who is dedicated to the pursuit of profitable enterprise. His name is used generically to refer to someone who is hard and only concerned with cold facts and numbers.

== In the story ==
In the story, Gradgrind is the father of five children, naming them after prominent utilitarians. He also ran a model school where young pupils were treated as machines, or pitchers which were to be filled to the brim with facts. This satirised the Scottish philosopher James Mill who attempted to develop his sons into perfect utilitarians.

His physical description personified this characterisation of the rigid and insistent pedagogue,

The speaker's obstinate carriage, square coat, square legs, square shoulders - nay, his very neckcloth, trained to take him by the throat...

— Charles Dickens, Hard Times

In a famous passage, a visiting mill-owner, Josiah Bounderby, asks Gradgrind's students, "Suppose you were going to carpet a room. Would you use a carpet having a representation of flowers upon it?" The character Sissy Jupe replies, ingenuously, that she would because, "If you please, Sir, I am very fond of flowers".

"And is that why you would put tables and chairs upon them, and have people walking over them with heavy boots?"

"It wouldn't hurt them, Sir. They wouldn't crush and wither, if you please, Sir. They would be the pictures of what was very pretty and pleasant, and I would fancy..... -"

"Ay, Ay, Ay! But you mustn't fancy," cried the gentleman, quite elated by coming so happily to his point. "That's it! You are never to fancy."
"You are not, Cecilia Jupe," Thomas Gradgrind solemnly repeated, "to do anything of that kind".

"Fact, Fact, Fact!" said the gentleman. And "Fact, Fact, Fact!" repeated Thomas Gradgrind.
