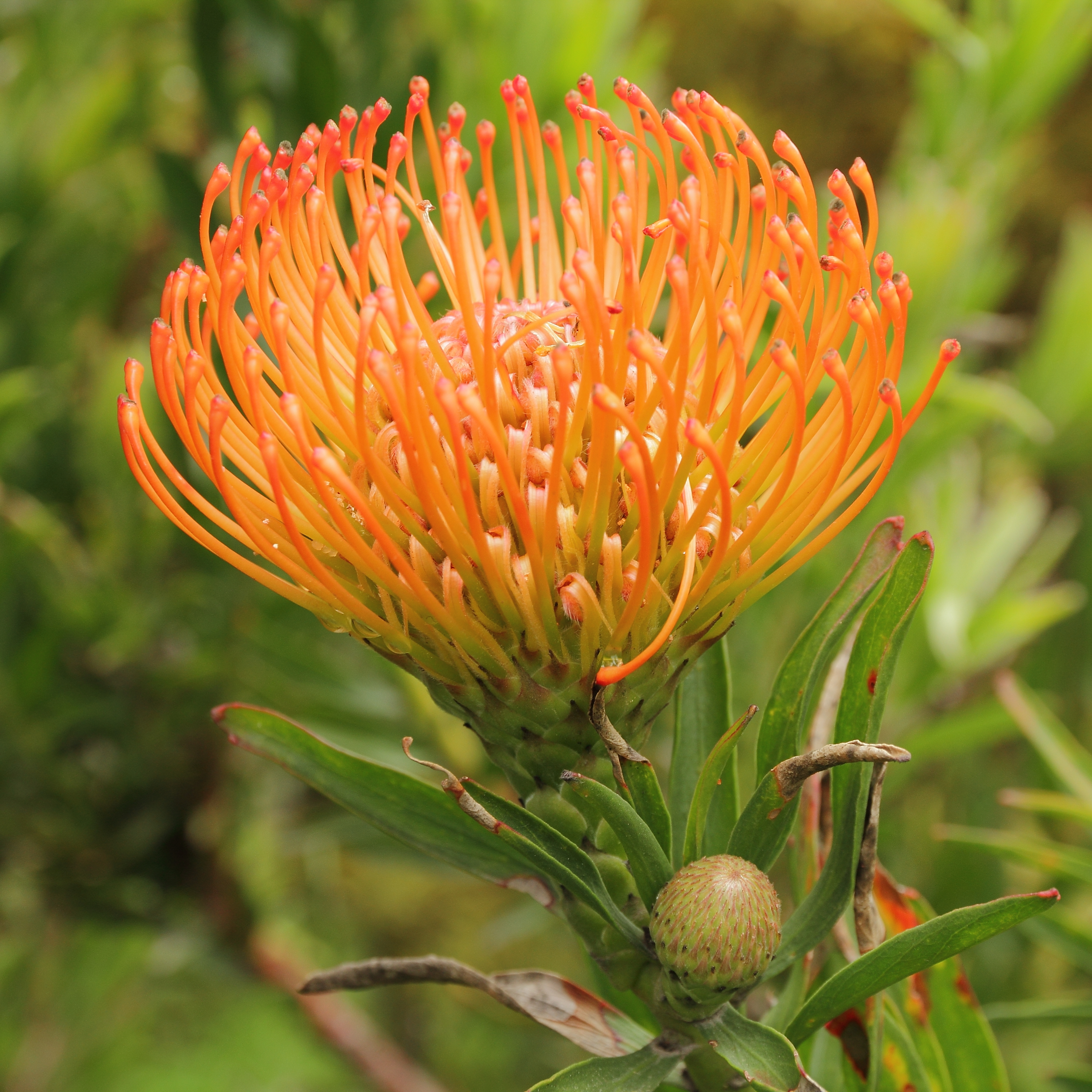

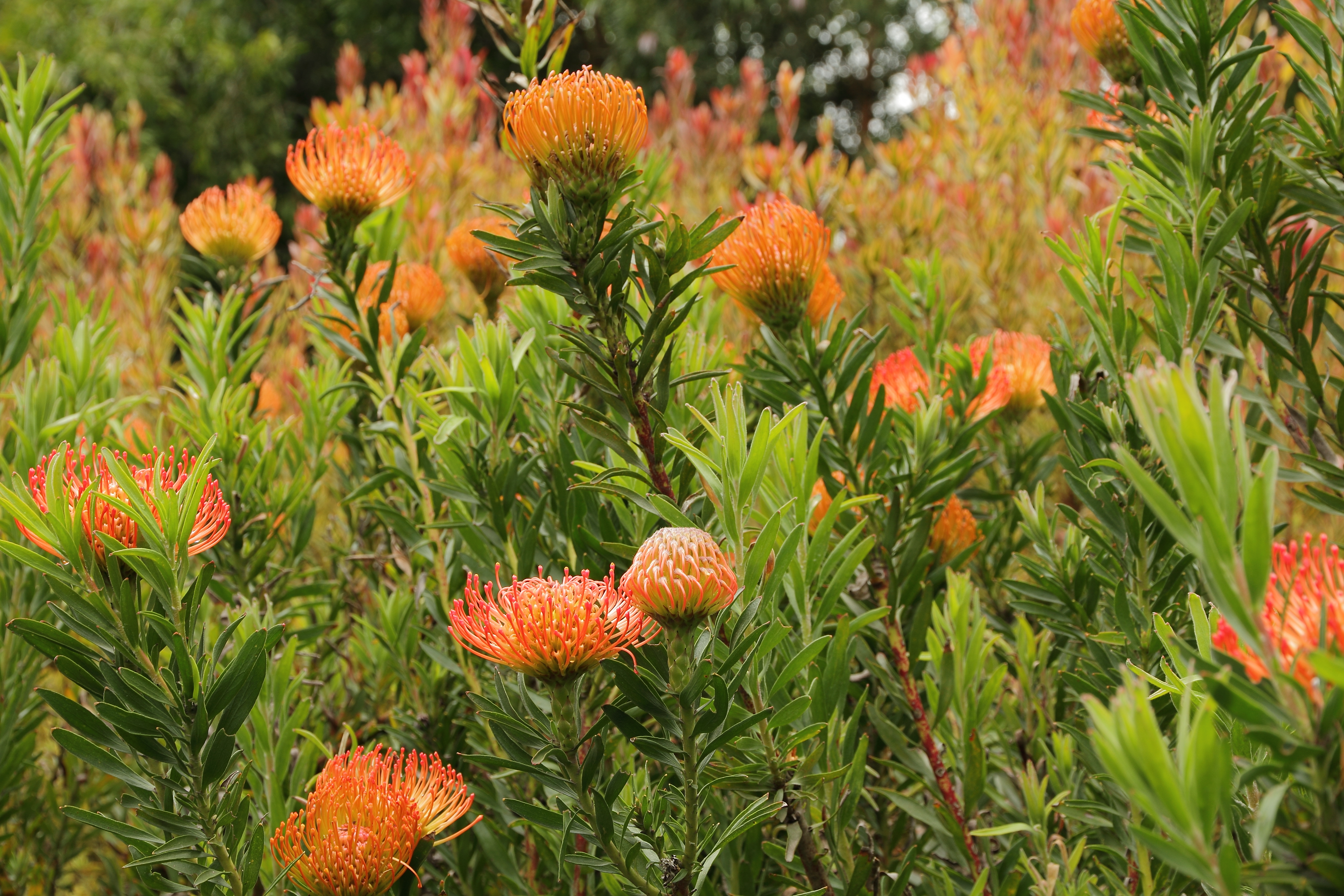

Conservation status
- Vulnerable (IUCN 3.1)

Scientific classification
- Kingdom: Plantae
- Clade: Tracheophytes
- Clade: Angiosperms
- Clade: Eudicots
- Order: Proteales
- Family: Proteaceae
- Genus: Leucospermum
- Species: L. catherinae

Binomial name
- Leucospermum catherinae E.Phillips

= Leucospermum catherinae =

Species of shrub from the Western Cape of South Africa

Leucospermum catherinae is a large evergreen, upright shrub of up to 4 m (13 ft) high from the family Proteaceae. It has hairless, inverted lance-shaped 9–13 cm long and 1–2½ cm wide leaves with a distinct stalk and three or four deep and blunt teeth toward the tip. The flower heads become disc-shaped with age, about 15 cm (5.9 in) in diameter, consisting of pale orange flowers. From the center of each flower emerges a long initially orange, later coppery bronze style with a thickened magenta tip that is bent clockwise, giving the entire head the appearance of a whirling pincushion. It is called Catherine-wheel pincushion or wheel flower in English and waterluisie in Afrikaans. Flowers can be found between September and December. It is an endemic species limited to the southwest of the Western Cape province of South Africa.

== Description ==
The Catherina-wheel pincushion is an evergreen, initially upright, but later spreading shrub of up to 3 m (9.8 ft) high, that branches from a single trunk at its foot. The flowering branches are upright, 5–8 mm (0.20–0.31 in) thick, covered with a very fine down. The hairless leaves are inverted lance- to ellips-shaped, 9–13 1/2 cm (3.5–5.3 in) long and 1–2 1/2 cm (0.39–0.98 in) wide, narrowing to a point at its base where it transforms into with a very short stalk. The leaf end has three or four deep and blunt teeth with a thickened tip. The leaves are alternately set, at an upward angle and somewhat overlapping.

The flower heads are initially globe-shaped with a somewhat flattened top, later more disc-shaped, about 15 cm (5.9 in) in diameter. The flowerhead sit on a stalk of about 1 cm (0.39 in) long, and are mostly standing individually towards the end of the branches. The common base of the flowers in the same head is narrowly cone-shaped with a pointy tip, about 3½ cm (1.4 in) long 1 cm (0.39 in) wide. The bract subtending the flower heads are pointy oval, 1–1 1/2 cm (0.39–0.59 in) long and 5–8 mm (0.20–0.31 in) wide, firmly pressed against the head's underside and overlapping, papery in consistency and the edges beset with a regular row of equal size hairs.

The bract subtending the individual flower is lance-shaped with a pointy tip, about 1¾ cm (0.7 in) long and ½ cm (0.2 in) wide, densely woolly at the base, papery with powdery hairs near the tip on the outer surface. The 4-merous perianth is 4–5 cm (1.6–2.0 in) long and pale orange in colour. In the lower part, where the lobes remain merged when the flower has opened (called tube), is 6–7 mm (0.24–0.28 in) long, bulging somewhat at the side facing the center of the head, keeled, hairless at the base and with some powdery hairs higher up. The lobes in the middle part (or claws), where the perianth is split lengthwise, are thread-like, coil back strongly on their base when the flower opens, and are covered with long soft hairs on the outside. Those facing the sides and the center of the head thickened and fleshy near the base. The upper part, which enclosed the pollen presenter in the bud consists of four strongly recurved, pointy lance-shaped limbs of about 6 mm (0.24 in) long and 1½ mm (0.06 in), and covered with fine silky hair on the outside. From the perianth emerges a style, that is initially orange, but later turns coppery bronze in colour, 7–8 cm (2.8–3.1 in) long, tapering towards the tip, growing strongly shen the flower opens and bending outward, the higher third bent clockwise at about a right angle. The so-called pollen presenter, onto which the pollen is transferred from the anthers in the bud, is magenta-coloured, narrowly cylinder-shaped with a pointy tip, about 6 mm (0.24 in) long, with a groove that performs the function of the stigma across the very tip. The ovary is subtended by four awl-shaped, opaque scales of about 3 mm (0.12 in) long.

=== Differences with related species ===
The Catherina-wheel pincushion differs from other pincushions because it has hairless, inverted lance-shaped 9–13 cm long and 1–2½ cm wide leaves with a distinct stalk and three or four deep and blunt teeth toward the tip.

== Taxonomy ==
Scottish botanist and early plant collector Francis Masson was the first person on record who collected the Catherina-wheel pincushion, but only stating it was from the Cape region (Prom. bonae Spei), without providing a locality or year. When Robert Harold Compton described L. catherinae in 1933, the location where it was collected was still uncertain for it was obtained at the Ceres wild flower show in 1931. The specimen collected in 1897 by Alfred Arthur Bodkin on the Krakadouw Pass in the Cedarberg apparently was unknown to Compton.

Compton chose the species name catherinae, partly because seen from above, the flower head is reminiscent of a wheel, and partly to honor mrs. Catherine van der Byl, who assisted him in finding the locations where this species grows.

L. catherinae has been assigned to the fireworks pincushions, section Cardinistyle.

== Distribution, habitat and ecology ==
L. catherinae can be found from the Middelberg in the Cedarberg mountains in the north, to the Kouebokkeveld Mountains and Ceres mountains in the south. Isolated populations occur at Bokkerivier and on the Piketberg Mountain. The species has a strong preference for moist situations, mostly growing on level sandy flats along the banks of year-round streams or in seepage areas with a gravelly underground of weathered table mountain sandstone. The locations where it grows have an elevation of 600–1,200 m (2,000–3,900 ft). Some plants grow on seemingly drier rocky slopes. The species usually grows solitary or with few individuals together.

Across the distribution range of this species the climate is mediterranean, with an average annual precipitation of at least 1,000 mm (39 in), most of which falls during the winter half year. The summers in the area tend to be hot and during the winter, temperatures may drop to freezing point.

Although bees frequently visit the flowers, they are not effective as pollinators. Several species of sunbirds and Cape sugarbirds on the other hand are responsible for pollinating this species. When they sit on top of the flowerheads and stick their bills into the flowers to extract nectar, their heads and breasts make contact with the pollen presenters that carry the pollen and the stigmatic groove. The fruits are ripe six to eight weeks after flowering, fall to the ground and are collected by native ants, who carry them to their nests. Here, the ants eat the pale, soft outer layer called elaiosome, leaving the smooth and hard seed because it is too big to fit between their jaws. The seeds so remain buried, safe from being consumed by rodents, and protected from the overhead wildfires that destroy most of the standing vegetation every one or two decades. After the fire, the seeds germinate, and are able to grow quickly, thanks to the absence of competition and a relatively good supply of nutrients.

== Conservation ==
The Catherine-wheel pincushion is considered an endangered species. The species is vulnerable due to its fragmented distribution. The loss of several subpopulations has been documented. The decline of the population may be due to water extraction from wetlands and groundwater.
