= Catherine wheel (firework) =

Type of firework

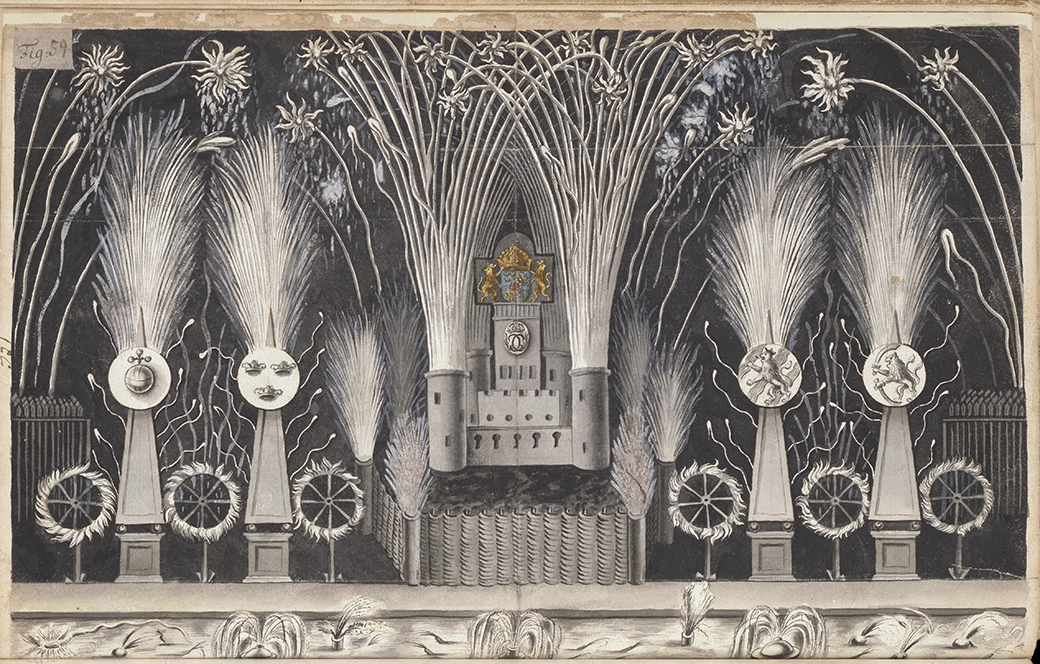
Fireworks design from the 18th century with six Catherine wheels

The Catherine wheel or pinwheel is a type of firework consisting either of a powder-filled spiral tube or an angled rocket mounted with a pin through its center. When ignited, the fireworks spin by the same process as an aeolipile.

The firework is named after Saint Catherine of Alexandria who, according to Christian tradition, was condemned to death by "breaking on the wheel". When she touched the wheel, it miraculously fell to pieces.

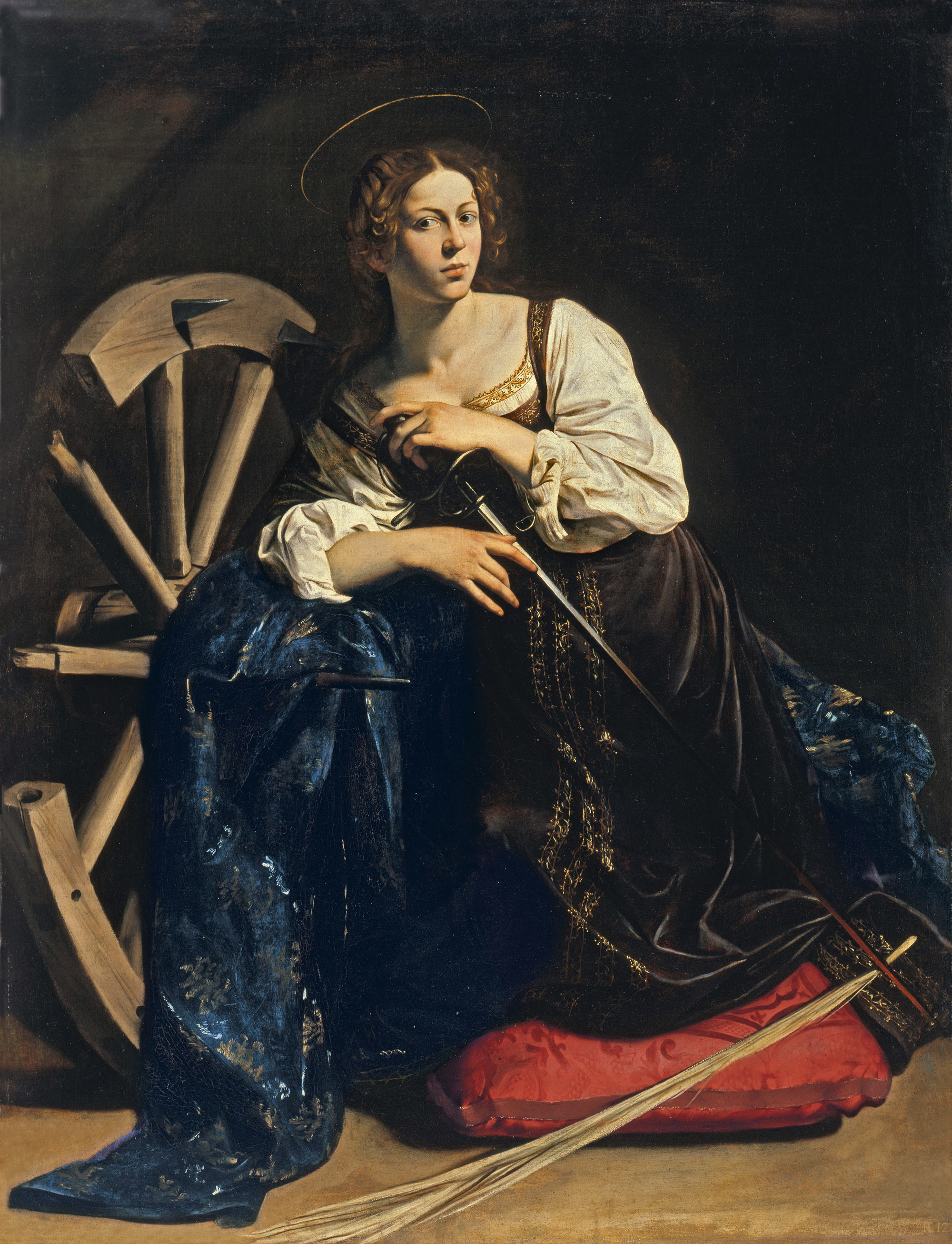
Painting of Saint Catherine of Alexandria

The largest Catherine wheel ever made was designed by the Lily Fireworks Factory of Mqabba, Malta. The Catherine wheel had a diameter of 32.044 m (105 ft 1.6 in), and was lit on 18 June 2011, the eve of the annual feast of Our Lady of the Lilies.

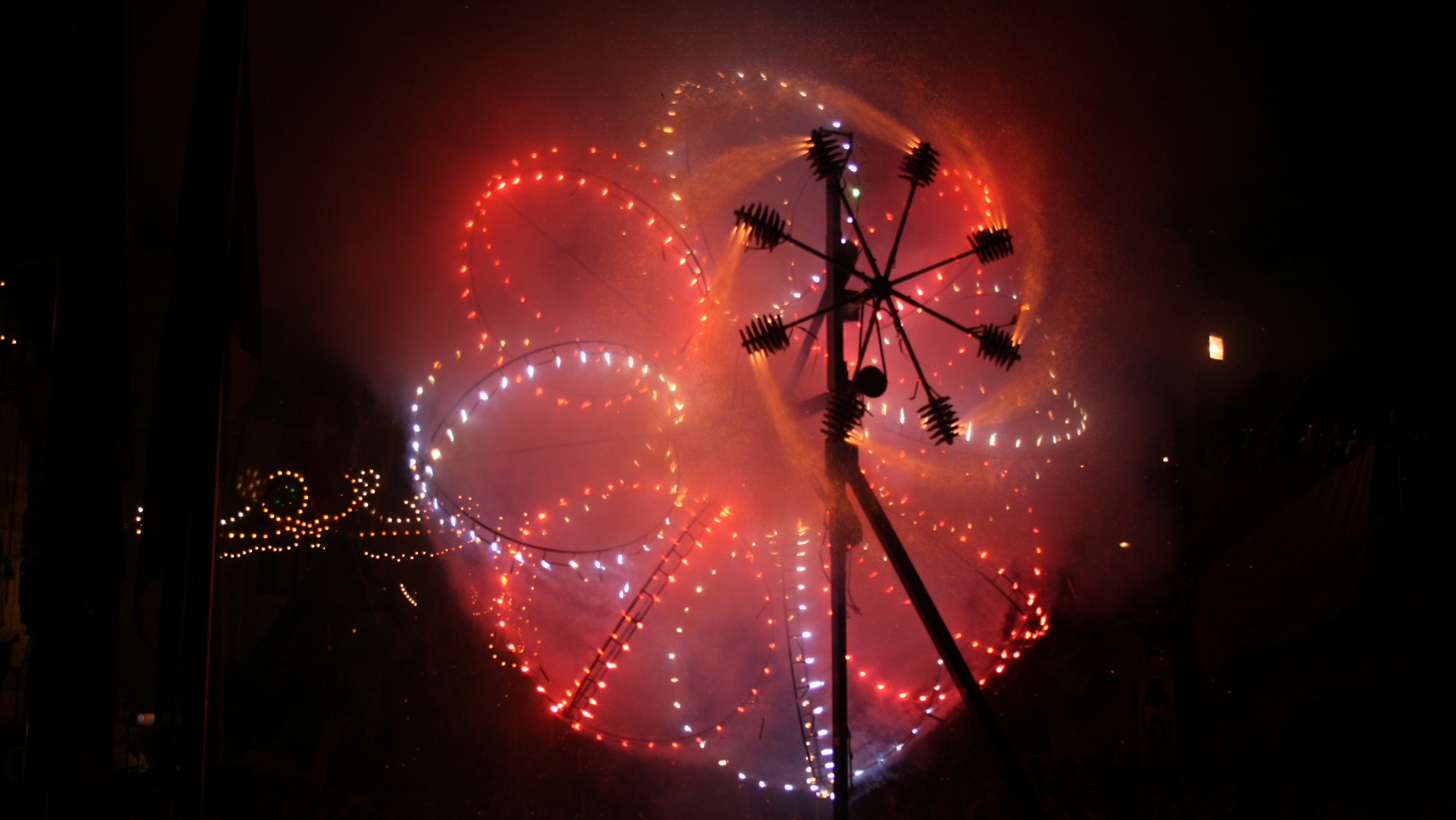
Catherine wheel at Qala, Malta

In Malta, Catherine wheels (known in Maltese as nar tal-art or ġigġifogu) are a traditional fixture during every village Catholic feast (festa). Some villages even hold competitions on the eve of the parish feast, while others display the vast work of one firework. Entrants display a variety of moving shapes and include various colours year after year as the technology progresses. These displays are only a small part of the firework catalogue planned throughout the week preceding the feast and on the feast day itself. The Catherine wheel displays typically end with the burning of what is called 'the carpet': the largest Catherine wheel in the display on the night.

In the Philippines, the Catherine wheel is also known as trompillo, and according to Republic Act 7183, it is a legal firework.
