= King George V Dock =

King George V Dock may refer to:

- King George V Dock, Glasgow
- King George V Dock, Hull
- King George V Dock, London

See also:

- King George V Graving Dock, Southampton
- King George VI Dock, Singapore
