= Cassandra =

Mythological prophetess and princess of Troy

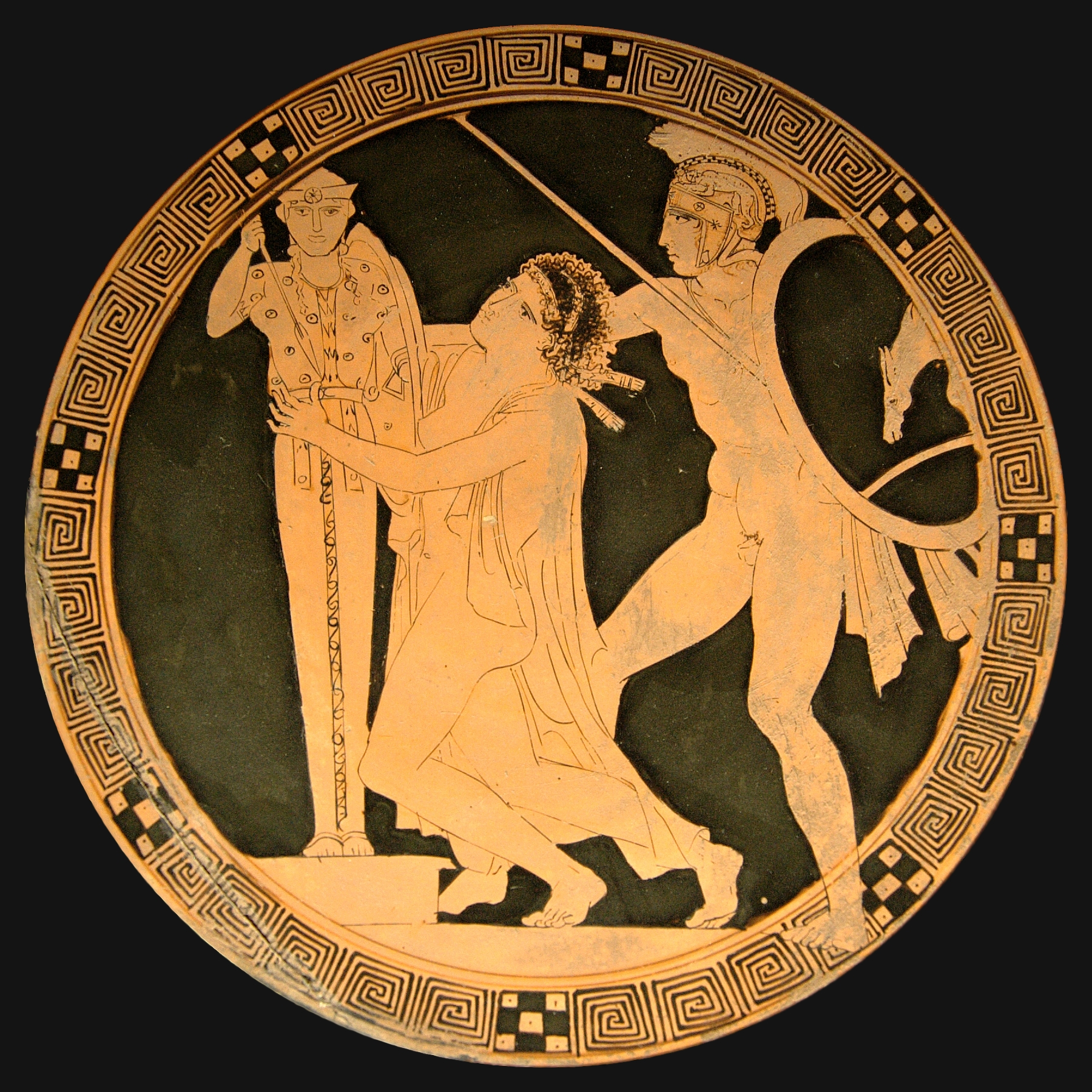
Ajax pulling Cassandra, tondo of a red-figure cup by the Kodros Painter, c. 440 BC.

In Greek mythology, Cassandra, also spelled Kassandra or Casandra, (/kə.ˈsæn.drə/; Ancient Greek: Κασ(σ)άνδρα, pronounced [kas:ándra], or referred to as Alexandra; Ἀλεξάνδρα) was a Trojan priestess dedicated to the god Apollo and fated by him to utter true prophecies, but never to be believed. Cassandra lived through the Trojan War and survived the sack of the city, but was murdered by Clytemnestra and Aegisthus when Agamemnon brought her to Mycenae as a pallake.

In contemporary usage, her name is employed as a rhetorical device to indicate a person whose accurate predictions, generally of impending disaster, are not believed.

== Etymology ==
Hjalmar Frisk (Griechisches Etymologisches Wörterbuch, Heidelberg, 1960–1970) notes "unexplained etymology", citing "various hypotheses" found in Wilhelm Schulze, Edgar Howard Sturtevant, J. Davreux, and Albert Carnoy. R. S. P. Beekes cites García Ramón's derivation of the name from the Proto-Indo-European (PIE) root *(s)kend- "raise". The Online Etymology Dictionary states the name is of uncertain origin "though the second element looks like a fem. form of Greek andros 'of man, male human being.'" Watkins suggests PIE *(s)kand- "to shine" as source of second element. The name also has been connected to the Greek kekasmai "to surpass, excel."

== Description ==
Cassandra was described by the chronicler Malalas in his account of the Chronography as "shortish, round-faced, white, mannish figure, good nose, good eyes, dark pupils, blondish, curly, good neck, bulky breasts, small feet, calm, noble, priestly, an accurate prophet foreseeing everything, practicing hard, virgin". Meanwhile, in the account of Dares the Phrygian, she was illustrated as ". . .of moderate stature, round-mouthed, and auburn-haired. Her eyes flashed. She knew the future." In the Iliad, Homer described Cassandra as the fairest of all Priam's daughters. Euripides wrote that she had light (xanthous) hair and wore a crown of laurels when prophesying. Ibycus mentioned that she was light-eyed (glaukopida), an epithet also used for Athena.

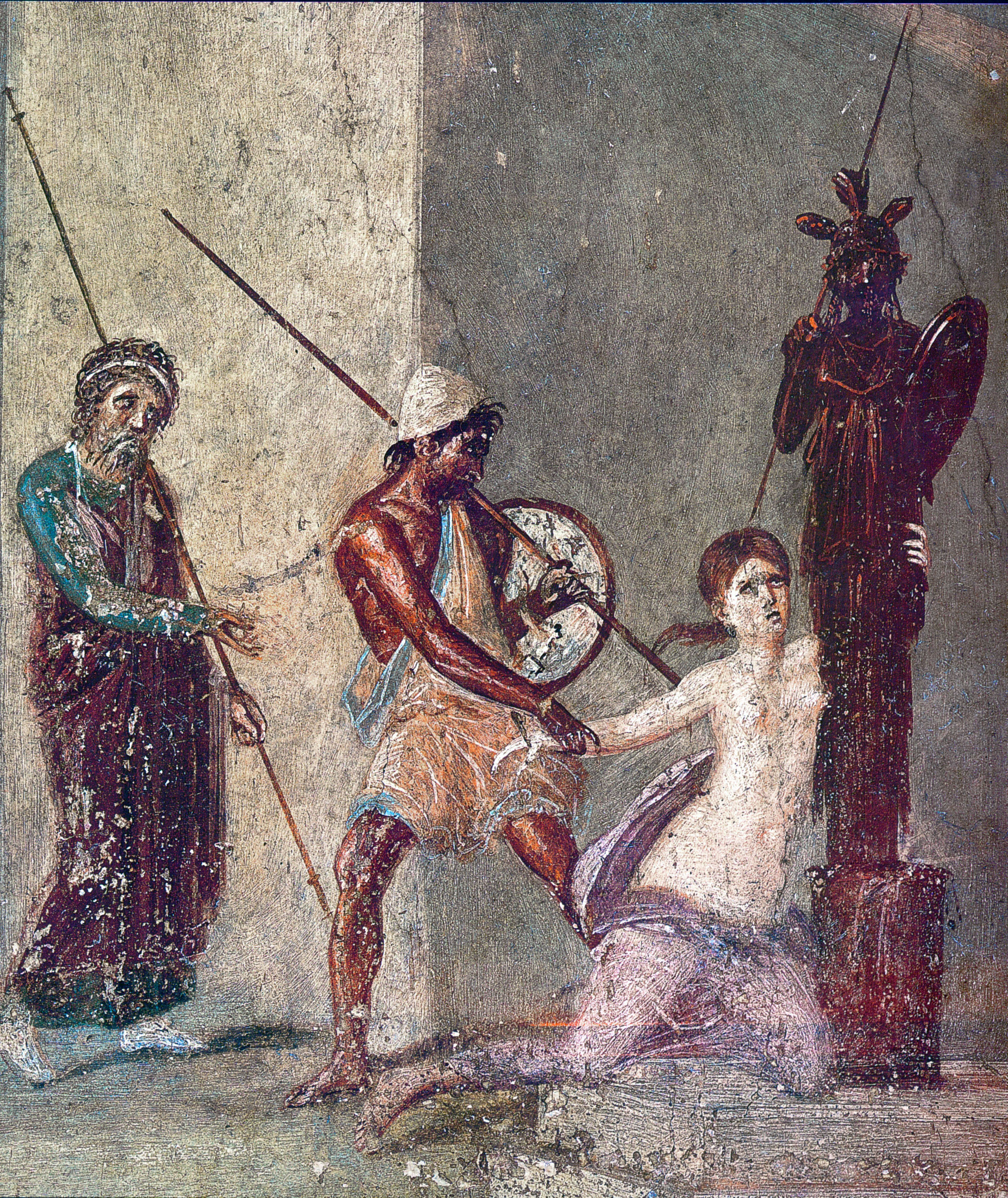
Ajax the Lesser drags Cassandra from Palladium before eyes of Priam, Roman mural from the Casa del Menandro, Pompeii

== Gift of prophecy ==
Cassandra was given the gift of uttering true prophecies, but was cursed so that they would never be believed. Commonly, Cassandra incurred Apollo's wrath by refusing him sexual favours after promising herself to him in exchange for the gift of prophecy. In Aeschylus' Agamemnon, she bemoans her relationship with the god:

Apollo, Apollo!
God of all ways, but only Death's to me,
Once and again, O thou, Destroyer named,
Thou hast destroyed me, thou, my love of old!

And she acknowledges her fault:

I consented [marriage] to Loxias [Apollo] but broke my word. ... Ever since that fault I could persuade no one of anything.

Latin author Hyginus writes in his Fabulae:

Cassandra, daughter of the king and queen, in the temple of Apollo, exhausted from practising, is said to have fallen asleep; whom, when Apollo wished to embrace her, she did not afford the opportunity of her body. On account of which thing, when she prophesied true things, she was not believed.

However, other versions of the story have been given; Tzetzes wrote that Cassandra and her brother Helenus received their gifts of prophecy after being left overnight in the temple of Apollo, and in the morning they were found with serpents licking their ears. Additionally, Euripides wrote that Apollo left Cassandra to be a virgin, and the god was angered when Agamemnon took her as a concubine.

Her cursed gift became an endless pain and frustration to her. She was seen as a liar and a madwoman by her family and by the Trojan people. Because of this, her father, Priam, had locked her away in a chamber and guarded her like the madwoman she was believed to be. Though Cassandra made many predictions that went unheeded, the one prophecy that was believed was that of Paris being her abandoned brother.

== Ancient sources ==
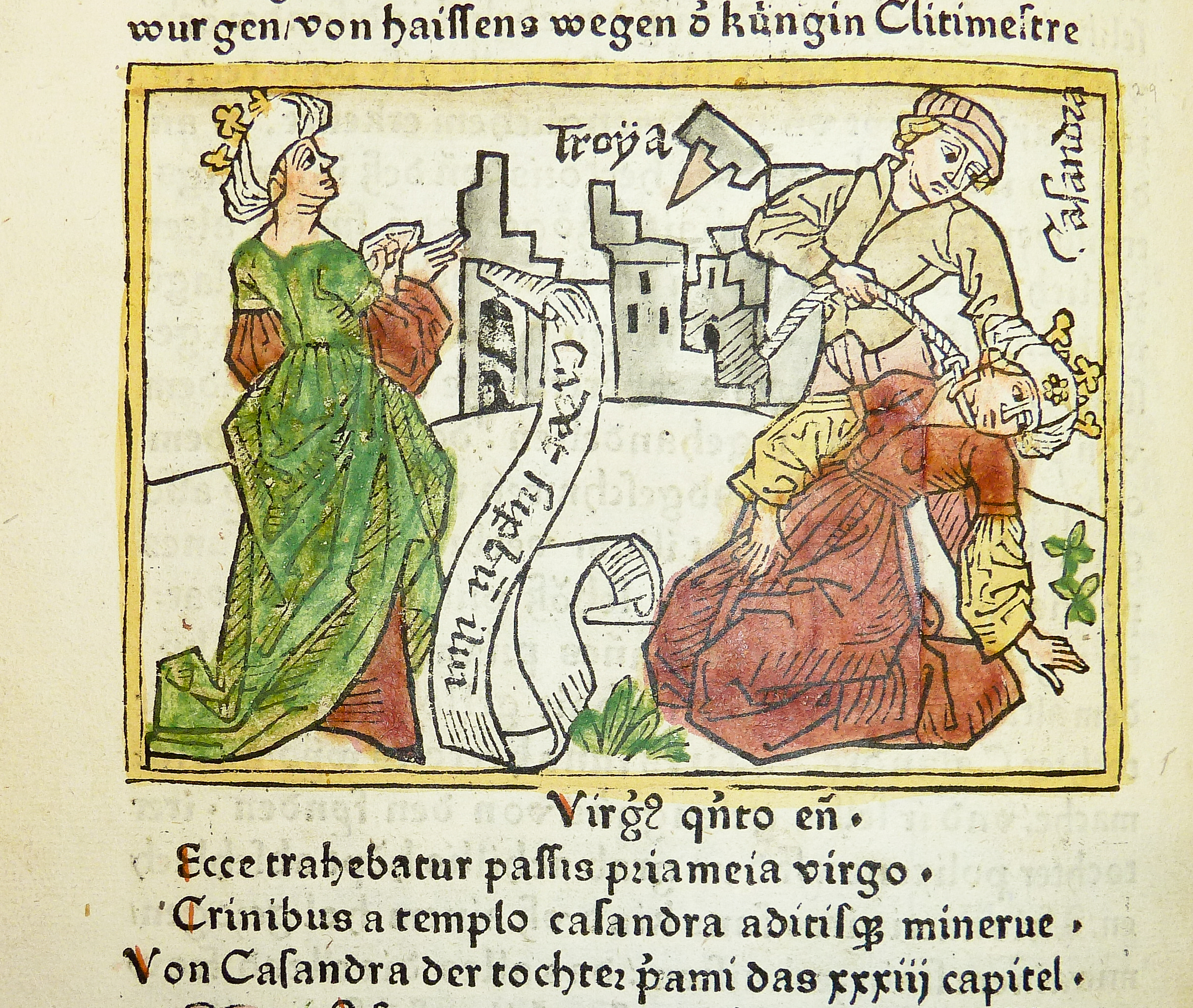
Woodcut illustration of Cassandra's prophecy of the fall of Troy (left) and her death (right), from Giovanni Boccaccio's De mulieribus claris, printed by Johann Zainer at Ulm ca. 1474.

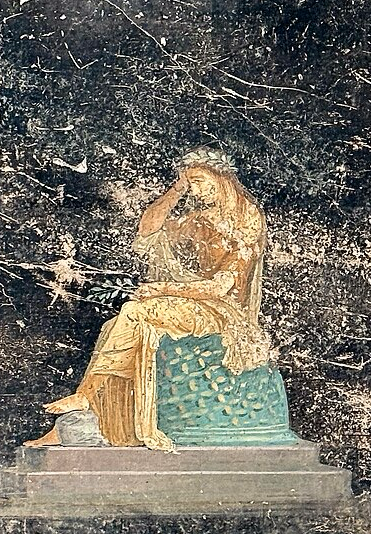
Fresco of Cassandra from Pompeii’s recently excavated Black Room

Cassandra appears in texts by Homer, Virgil, Aeschylus and Euripides. While details such as her parentage remain the same between accounts, each author depicts her prophetic powers differently.

=== Homer ===
Cassandra is mentioned in both the Iliad and the Odyssey. In the Iliad, she is named as the comeliest daughter of King Priam, and a "peer of golden Aphrodite." She was promised to marry Othryoneus, who had only come to aid Troy for her, before he was killed by Idomeneus. When her brother Hector was killed, she announced his death to the Trojan people so they could mourn and see his body as it was brought back into the city.

In the Odyssey, Agamemnon's shade informs Odysseus of his death at the hands of his wife Clytemnestra; Cassandra was murdered as she stood next to him.

=== Virgil ===
As the Aeneid takes place after Cassandra's death, she is mentioned by several characters but does not appear herself. Cassandra is mentioned prophesying the fall of Troy and Aeneas' journey to Italy. In one scene, when Trojan soldiers saw the Greeks had kidnapped Cassandra from Minerva's temple and bound her in chains, they attempted to free her but were quickly defeated. Coroebus, who was in love with Cassandra, was the first to charge into battle. He died alongside Rhipeus, Dymas and Hypanis.

=== Seneca the Younger ===
Likewise Seneca the Younger, in his play Agamemnon, has her prophesy why Agamemnon deserves his recorded death:

Quid me vocatis sospitem solam e meis, umbrae meorum? te sequor, tota pater Troia sepulte; frater, auxilium Phrygum terrorque Danaum, non ego antiquum decus video aut calentes ratibus ambustis manus, sed lacera membra et saucios vinclo gravi illos lacertos. te sequor... (Ag. 741–747)

Why do you call me, the lone survivor of my family, My shades? I follow you, father buried with all of Troy; Brother, bulwark of Trojans, terroriser of Greeks, I do not see your beauty of old or hands warmed by burnt ships, But your lacerated limbs and those famous shoulders savaged By heavy chains. I follow you...

This behaviour is reflected in acts 4 and 5 as "her mantic vision" is "supplemented by a further (in)sight into what is going on inside the palace in act 5 when she becomes a quasi-messenger and provides a meticulous account of Agamemnon's murder in the bath: 'I see and I am there and I enjoy it, no false vision deceives my eyes: let's watch' (video et intersum et fruor, / imago visus dubia non fallit meos: / spectemus.)."

=== Aeschylus ===
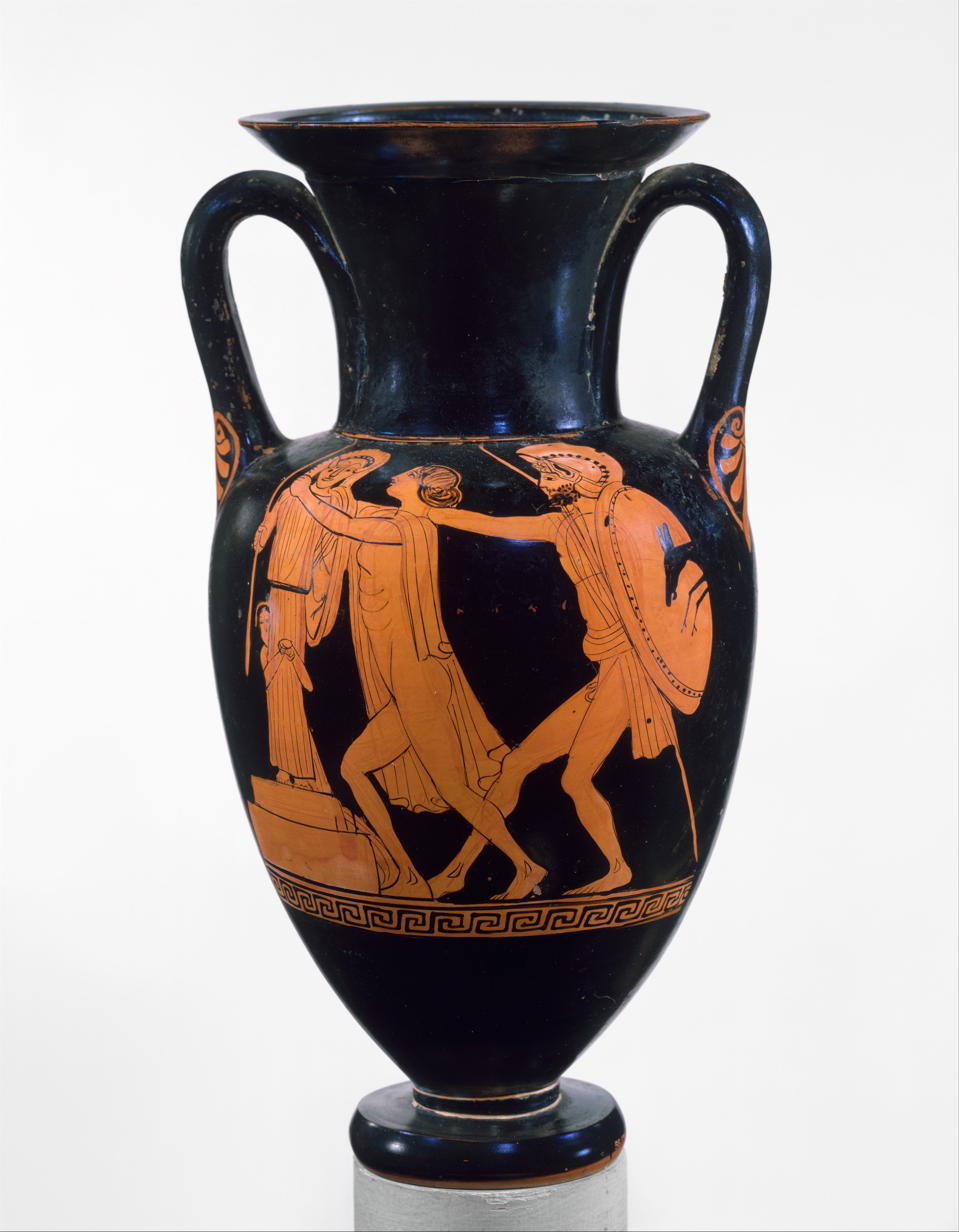
"Cassandra and Ajax" depicted on a terracotta amphora, circa 450 BC.

In Aeschylus' Agamemnon, a play in the Oresteia trilogy, Cassandra has been taken by Agamemnon to Mycenae, where they are welcomed home by Clytemnestra and an entourage of servants. Agamemnon enters the palace after his wife but Cassandra remains outside in the chariot. There, Cassandra receives violent visions and prophesies that Clytemnestra will murder Agamemnon; a crowd watches on, but is unable to comprehend what she says.

In this version of the story, Clytemnestra waits until Agamemnon has gotten into the bath before she entangles him in a net and stabs him three times with a blade. Cassandra, accepting her fate, walks into her inevitable offstage murder with full knowledge of what is to befall her. Clytemnestra announces that she murdered Cassandra to avenge her honour as a wife, as she was insulted that Agamemnon took a concubine.

== Mythology ==
=== Before the fall of Troy ===
Deiphobus and Cassandra (wielding an axe) attack Paris on an altar. Etruscan bronze mirror, c. 310 BC

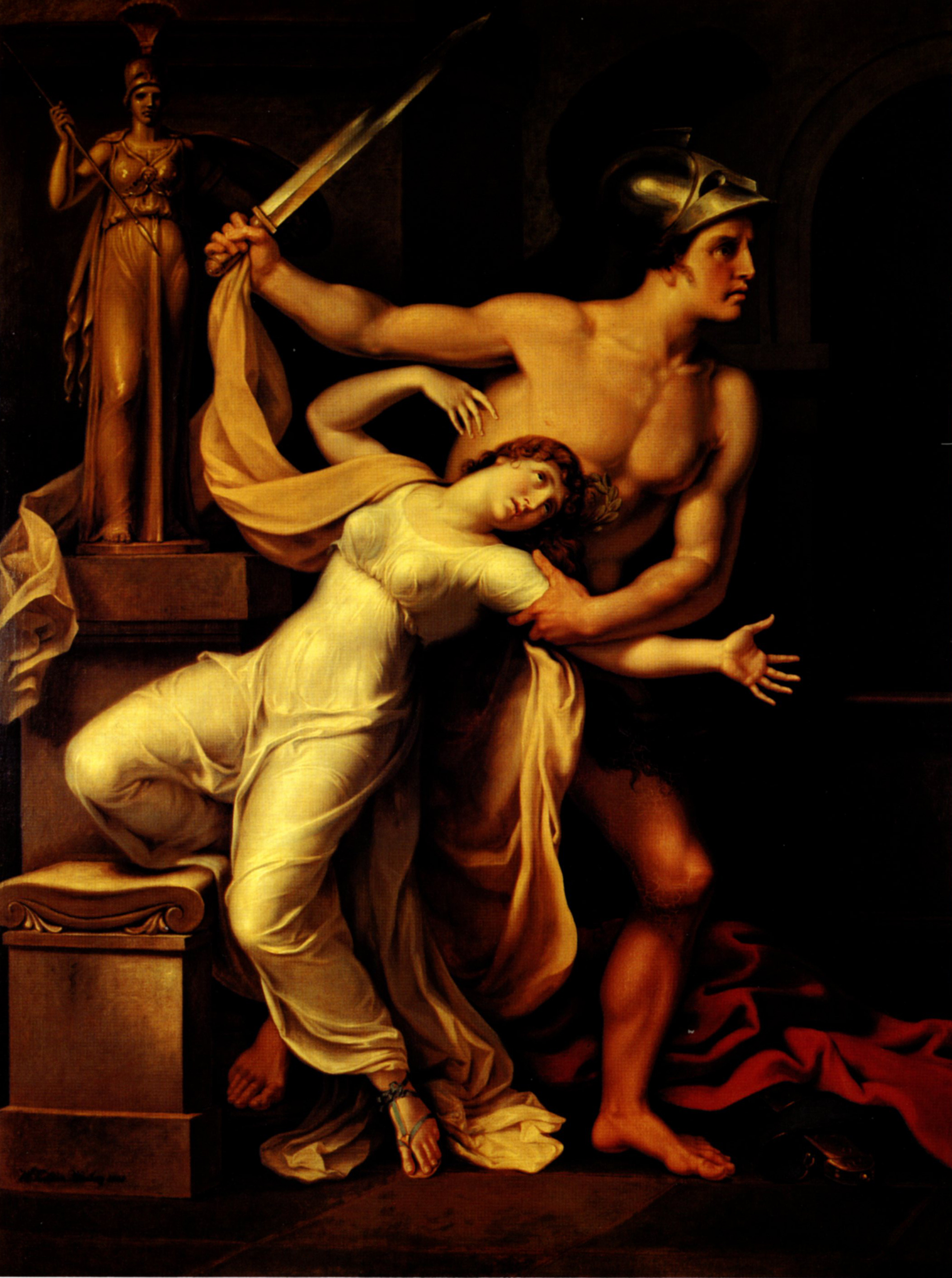
Ajax and Cassandra by Johann Heinrich Wilhelm Tischbein, 1806

According to Euripides' Andromache, it was Cassandra who declared that her infant brother Paris must be killed, for he would bring Troy's doom. In other sources, it is Aesacus or otherwise unnamed seers who make this prophecy at the boy's birth.

After Paris returned to Troy and won his own funeral games, his outraged brother Deiphobus tried to kill him. When Paris took refuge at an altar, Cassandra revealed his true heritage as the exposed prince and he was spared. It has often been assumed that artistic depictions of the recognition show her wielding an axe.

From the Cypria's summary and fragments of tragedies, it is known that, before the fall of Troy, Cassandra foresaw that if Paris went to Sparta and brought Helen back as his wife, her arrival would spark the Trojan War and lead to the destruction of the city. Ignoring Cassandra's warning, Paris went to Sparta and returned with Helen. According to Colluthus, when Cassandra saw Helen arriving, she tore her own hair and flung away her golden veil in a gesture of grief.

In the Aeneid, Cassandra warned the Trojans about the Greeks hiding inside the Trojan Horse, Agamemnon's death, her own demise at the hands of Aegisthus and Clytemnestra, her mother Hecuba's fate, Odysseus's ten-year wanderings before returning home, and the murder of Aegisthus and Clytemnestra by the latter's children Electra and Orestes. Cassandra additionally predicted that her cousin Aeneas would escape during the fall of Troy and found a new nation in Rome.

=== The sack of Troy ===
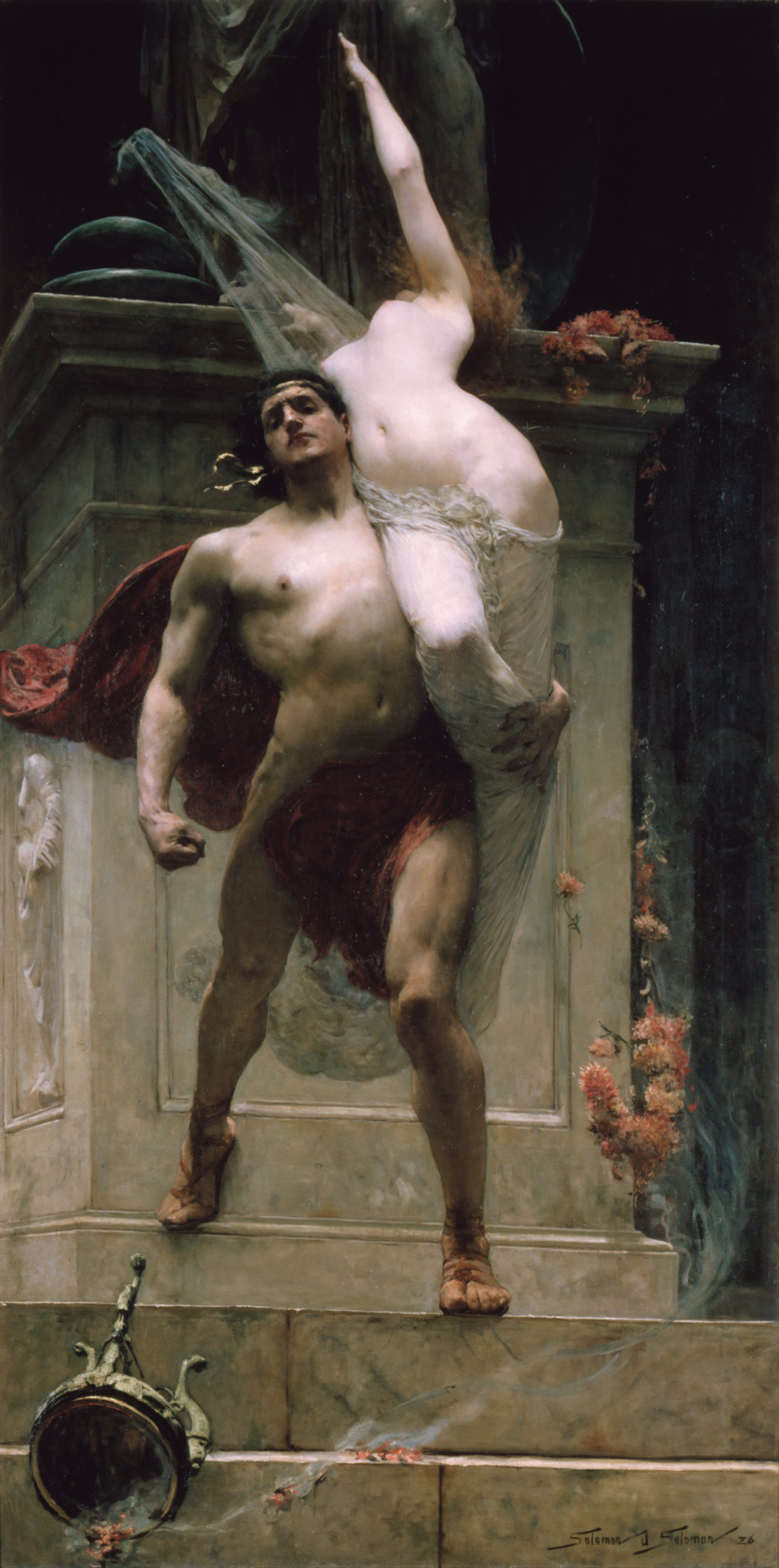
Ajax and Cassandra by Solomon J. Solomon, 1886.

Coroebus came to the aid of Troy during the Trojan War out of love for Cassandra and in exchange for her hand in marriage, but was killed in the sack of Troy. Another suitor, Othronus, was also killed. According to one account, Priam offered Cassandra to Telephus's son Eurypylus, in order to induce Eurypylus to fight on the side of the Trojans. Cassandra was also the first to see the body of her brother Hector being brought back to the city.

In The Fall of Troy by Quintus Smyrnaeus, Cassandra attempted to warn the Trojan people that Greek warriors were hiding in the Trojan Horse while they were celebrating their victory over the Greeks with feasting. Disbelieving Cassandra, the Trojans resorted to calling her names and hurling insults at her. Attempting to prove herself right, Cassandra took an axe in one hand and a burning torch in the other, and ran towards the Trojan Horse, intent on destroying the Greeks herself, but the Trojans stopped her. The Greeks hiding inside the Horse were relieved, but alarmed by how clearly she had divined their plan.

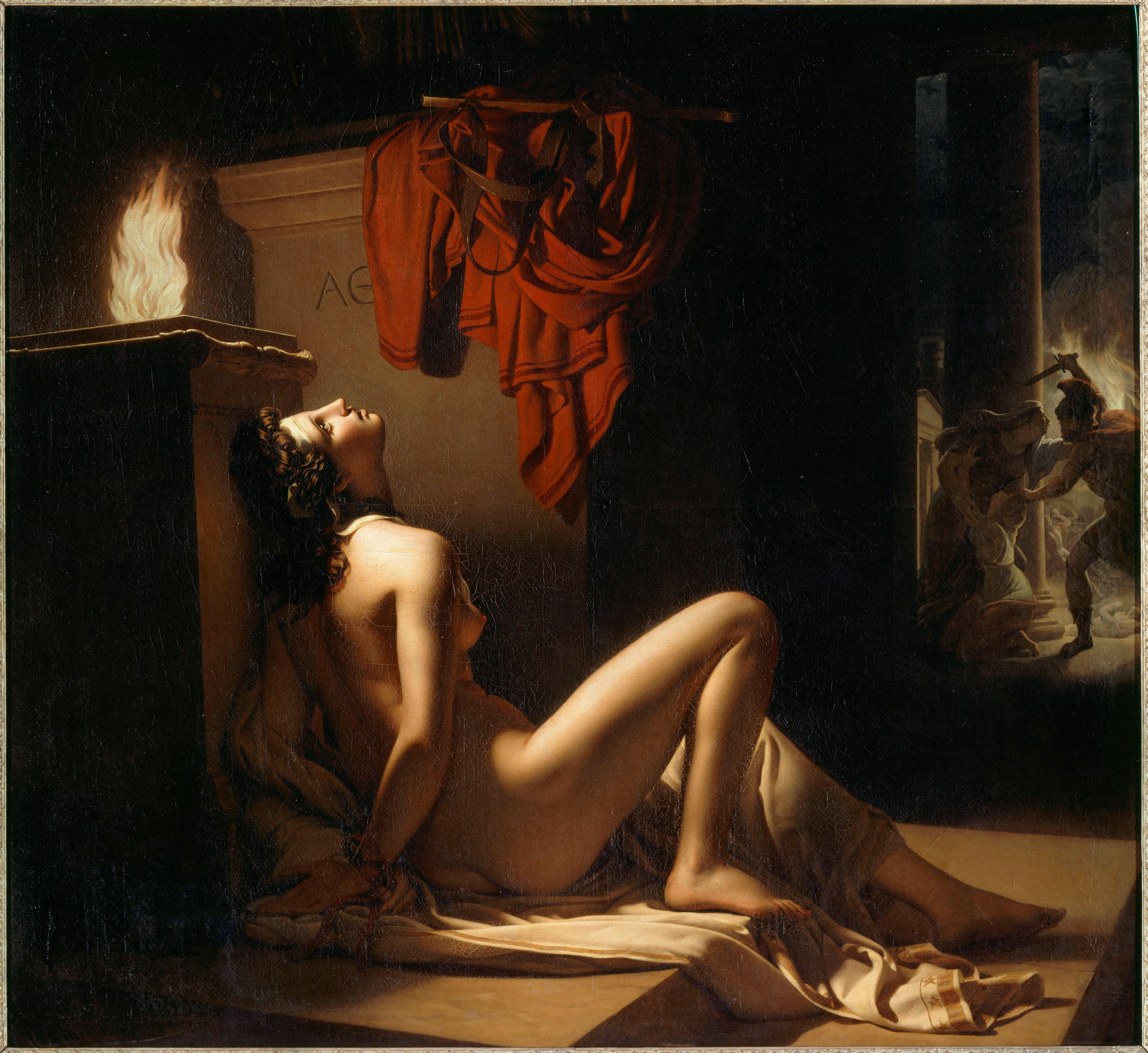
Cassandra Imploring the Vengeance of Minerva Against Ajax, by Jerome-Martin Langlois, 1810–1838.

During the sack of the city, Cassandra sought shelter in the temple of Athena. There, she embraced the wooden statue of Athena in supplication for her protection but was abducted and brutally raped by Ajax the Lesser. Cassandra clung so tightly to the statue of the goddess that Ajax knocked it from its stand as he dragged her away. Ajax's actions amounted to sacrilege, as he had defiled both Athena's temple and a person under her protection.

In Pseudo-Apollodorus' Epitome Ajax's death comes at the hands of both Athena and Poseidon. Athena threw a thunderbolt at his ship, destroying it. Ajax made his way to safety on a rock and declared that he had been saved in spite of Athena's intentions. However Poseidon then split the rock with his trident, casting Ajax to his death. Eventually his body washed up on the shores of Myconos, where he was buried by Thetis.

In some versions Cassandra intentionally left a chest behind in Troy that would curse whichever Greek opened it first. Inside the chest was an image of Dionysus, made by Hephaestus and presented to the Trojans by Zeus. It was given to the Greek leader Eurypylus as a part of his share of the victory spoils of Troy. When he opened the chest and saw the image of the god, he went mad.

=== The aftermath of Troy and Cassandra's death ===
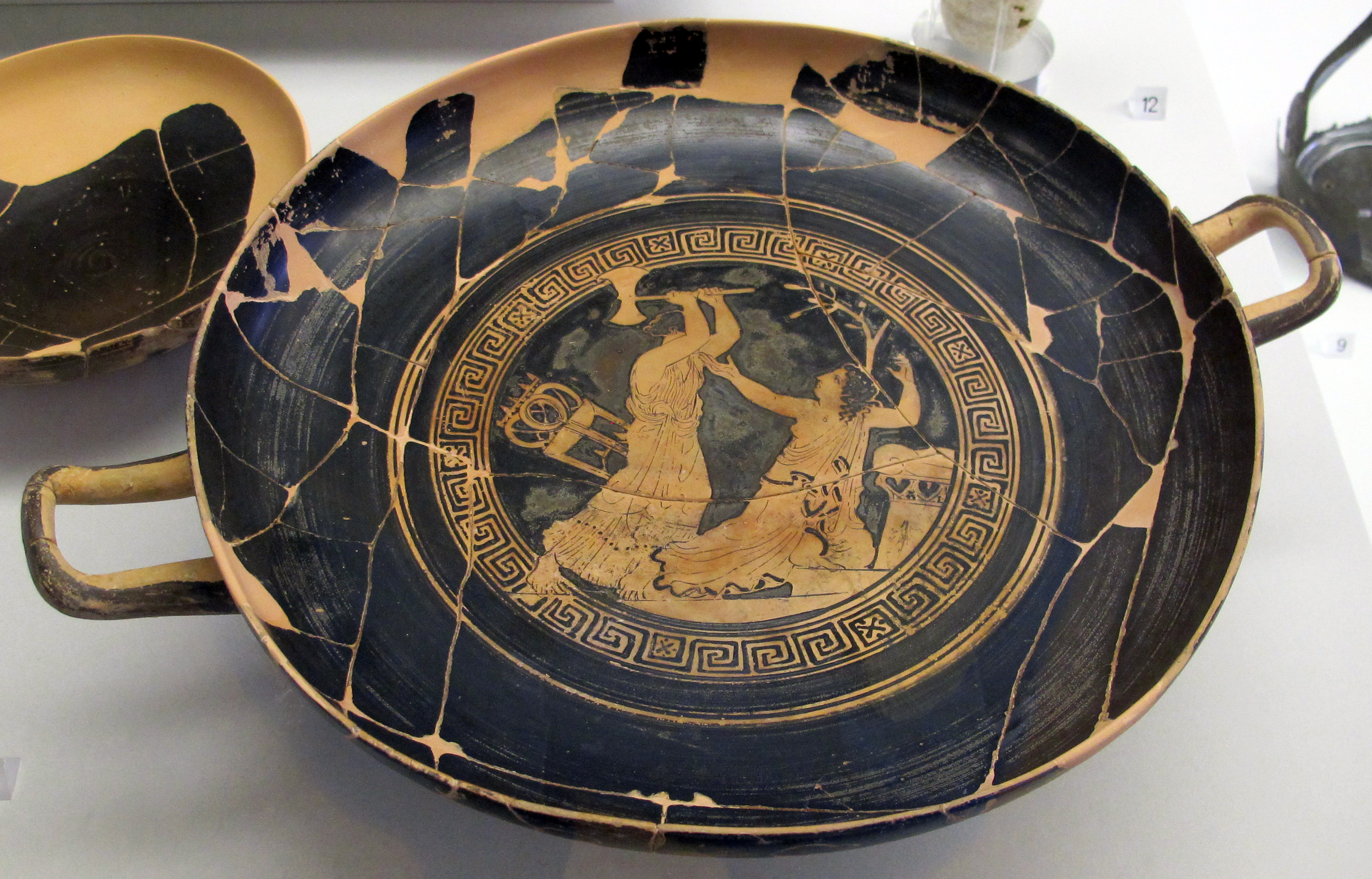
Clitennestra assale Cassandra davanti all'ara di Apollo (lit, "Clytemnestra attacks Cassandra before the altar of Apollo"), 425-400 bc.

Once Troy had fallen, Cassandra was taken as a pallake (concubine) by King Agamemnon of Mycenae. While he was away at war, Agamemnon's wife, Clytemnestra, had taken Aegisthus as her lover. When Cassandra and Agememnon returned to Mycenae, they were ambushed and murdered by Clytemnestra or Aegisthus. Various sources state that Cassandra and Agamemnon had twin boys, Teledamus and Pelops, who were murdered by Aegisthus.

The final resting place of Cassandra is either in Amyclae or Mycenae. Statues of Cassandra exist both in Amyclae and across the Peloponnese peninsula from Mycenae to Leuctra. In Mycenae, German businessman and amateur archaeologist Heinrich Schliemann erroneously claimed to have discovered in Grave Circle A the graves of Cassandra and Agamemnon and telegraphed back to King George I of Greece:

With great joy I announce to Your Majesty that I have discovered the tombs which the tradition proclaimed by Pausanias indicates to be the graves of Agamemnon, Cassandra, Eurymedon and their companions, all slain at a banquet by Clytemnestra and her lover Aegisthos.

However, it was later discovered that the graves predated the Trojan War by at least 300 years.

== See also ==
- Apollo archetype
- Novikov self-consistency principle
- The Boy Who Cried Wolf
- Tiresias
- Comaetho
- Medusa

== Primary sources ==
- Homer. Iliad XXIV, 697–706; Odyssey XI, 405–434;
- Aeschylus. Agamemnon
- Euripides. The Trojan Women; Electra
- Bibliotheca III, xii, 5; Epitome V, 17–22; VI, 23
- Virgil. Aeneid II, 246–247, 341–346, 403–408
- Lycophron. Alexandra
- Triphiodorus: The Sack of Troy
- Quintus Smyrnaeus: Posthomerica
