= Pre-Greek substrate bibliography =

This is a bibliography of works on the Pre-Greek substrate. A number of bibliographies on the subject have been published in literature, but most focus on the relationship between Greek and Minoan or Anatolian.

- Meester, Lotte (2024). "Substrate stratification: An argument against the unity of Pre-Greek". In Guus Kroonen (ed.). Sub-Indo-European Europe: Problems, Methods, Results. Berlin, Boston: De Gruyter Mouton. pp. 283–300. doi:10.1515/9783111337920-009. ISBN 978-3-11-133792-0.
- Kroonen, Guus (2024). "For the nth time: The Pre-Greek νϑ-suffix revisited". In Guus Kroonen (ed.). Sub-Indo-European Europe: Problems, Methods, Results. Berlin, Boston: De Gruyter Mouton. pp. 301–332. doi:10.1515/9783111337920-010. ISBN 978-3-11-133792-0.
- Kuzmanovska, Jasminka (2023-12-21). "Traces of Pre-Greek Linguistics Substratum in Early Byzantine Toponymy: Lists Related to Macedonia and Thessaly in Procopius' "Buildings"". Studia Ceranea: Journal of the Waldemar Ceran Research Centre for the History and Culture of the Mediterranean Area and South-East Europe (13): 539–553. doi:10.18778/2084-140X.13.27. eISSN 2084-140X.
- De Abreu e Souza Rafaela, Freire (2022-10-31). Aspects of Non-Greek Vocabulary in Mycenaean Greek (Thesis). Athens: National and Kapodistrian University.
- Bengtson, John D.; Leschber, Corinna (2021-12-16). "Notes on some Pre-Greek words in relation to Euskaro-Caucasian (North Caucasian + Basque)" (PDF). Journal of Language Relationship. 19 (1–2): 71–98. doi:10.31826/jlr-2021-191-210. eISSN 2219-4029.
- Obrador-Cursach, Bartolomeu (2021-12-16). "Hypotheses of interference between Greek and the languages of Ancient Anatolia: the case of patronymics". Journal of Language Relationship. 19 (1–2): 54–70. doi:10.1515/jlr-2021-191-209 (inactive 12 July 2025). eISSN 2219-4029.
- Tardivo, Giampaolo (2021-08-02). "People, Sounds and the Environment. The Aegean-Daghestani Connection". Language and Text. 8 (2): 4–20. doi:10.17759/langt.2021080201. eISSN 2312-2757.
- Yakubovich, Ilya (2021-06-29). "The Anatolian Connections of the Greek God Enyalius". Linguistic and Cultural Interactions between Greece and Anatolia. pp. 233–245. doi:10.1163/9789004461598_012. ISBN 9789004461598.
- Dardano, Paola (2021-06-29). "Homeric Covenantal Terminology and Its Near Eastern Forerunners". Linguistic and Cultural Interactions between Greece and Anatolia. pp. 40–79. doi:10.1163/9789004461598_004. ISBN 9789004461598.
- García Ramón, José Luis (2021-06-29). "Anatolian and Greek in Contact: The Initive Periphrasis Hom. βῆ δ᾽ ἴμεν, Hitt. dai-/tii̯a- + supine -uu̯an, HLuv. ta- + Infinitive". Linguistic and Cultural Interactions between Greece and Anatolia. pp. 80–107. doi:10.1163/9789004461598_005. ISBN 9789004461598.
- Melchert, H. Craig (2021-06-29). "A Possible New Greco-Carian Contact Phenomenon". Linguistic and Cultural Interactions between Greece and Anatolia. pp. 108–115. doi:10.1163/9789004461598_006. ISBN 9789004461598.
- Oettinger, Norbert (2021-06-29). "Language Contact between Lydian and Greek or the Origin of Lydian k". Linguistic and Cultural Interactions between Greece and Anatolia. pp. 116–130. doi:10.1163/9789004461598_007. ISBN 9789004461598.
- Oreshko, Rostislav (2021-06-29). "In Search of the Holy Cube Roots: Kubaba—Kubeleya—Κύβεβος—Kufaws and the Problem of Ethnocultural Contact in Early Iron Age Anatolia". Linguistic and Cultural Interactions between Greece and Anatolia. BRILL. pp. 131–166. ISBN 9789004461598.
- Simon, Zsolt (2021-06-29). "The Mopsos Names and the Prehistory of the Lydians". Linguistic and Cultural Interactions between Greece and Anatolia. pp. 182–196. doi:10.1163/9789004461598_010. ISBN 9789004461598.
- Bianconi, Michele (2021-06-29). ""There and Back Again": A Hundred Years of Graeco-Anatolian Comparative Studies". Linguistic and Cultural Interactions between Greece and Anatolia. pp. 8–39. doi:10.1163/9789004461598_003. ISBN 9789004461598. Reviews:
- Merlin, Stella (2020). ""Pre-Greek" between theories and linguistic data: Examples from the Anatolian area"" (PDF). Studien zur historisch-vergleichenden Sprachwissenschaft. 17: 487–406. eISSN 2192-0133. ISBN 978-3-935536-26-4.
- Tardivo, Giampaolo (2020-07-01). "Labialization in Ægean and Nakh-Daghestanian Languages". Language and Text. 7 (1): 109–120. doi:10.17759/langt.2020070111. eISSN 2312-2757.
- Kitselis, Philippos; Tardivo, Giampaolo (2019-06-03). "Prometheus or Amirani. An updated study on the Pre-Greek substrate and its origins". Language and Text. 6 (3): 56–69. doi:10.17759/langt.2019060307. eISSN 2312-2757.
- Oreshko, Rostislav (2018). "Anatolian linguistic influences in Early Greek (1500–800 BC)? Critical observations against sociolinguistic and areal background". Journal of Language Relationship. 16 (1–2): 93–118. doi:10.31826/jlr-2018-161-209. eISSN 2219-4029. Reviews:
- Simon, Zsolt (2018). "Anatolian influences on Greek". Change, continuity, and connectivity: North-eastern Mediterranean at the turn of the Bronze Age and in the early Iron Age. Harrassowitz Verlag. pp. 376–418. ISBN 978-3-447-10969-7. Reviews:
- Hajnal, Ivo (2018-06-11). "Graeco-Anatolian contacts in the Mycenaean period". Handbook of Comparative and Historical Indo-European Linguistics. Vol. 3. Walter de Gruyter GmbH & Co KG. pp. 2037–2055. ISBN 9783110542431. Reviews:
- Kitselis, Philippos; Tardivo, Giampaolo. (May 2017). "Prometheus or Amirani part 2: An updated study on the Pre-Greek substrate and its origins".
- Meier-Brügger, Michael (2017). "The Lexicon of Greek". In Klein, Jared; Joseph, Brian; Fritz, Matthias (eds.). Handbook of Comparative and Historical Indo-European Linguistics. Vol. 1. Walter de Gruyter. ISBN 978-3-11-054243-1.
- Skelton, Christina (April 2017). "Greek-Anatolian Language Contact and the Settlement of Pamphylia" (PDF). Classical Antiquity. 36 (1): 104–129. doi:10.1525/ca.2017.36.1.104. eISSN 1067-8344.
- Chadwick, John (2016-03-07). "Pre-Greek languages". The Oxford Classical Dictionary (5th ed.). doi:10.1093/acrefore/9780199381135.013.5318. ISBN 978-0-19-938113-5.
- Romagno, Domenica (2014). "The Greek-Anatolian area in the 2nd millennium BC: between language contact, Indo-European inheritance and typologically natural tendencies". Studi e Saggi Linguistici. 53 (2): 429–446. eISSN 2281-9142.
- Hajnal, Ivo (2014). "Die griechisch-anatolischen Sprachkontakte zur Bronzezeit - Sprachbund oder loser Sprachkontakt?". Strategies of translation: Language contact and poetic language. Fabrizio Serra editore. pp. 105–116. ISBN 9788862277266. Reviews:
- Rose, Sarah (2014-10-22). "Greek and Anatolian languages". Encyclopedia of ancient Greek language and linguistics. Brill. pp. 27–31. ISBN 978-90-04-22597-8. Reviews:
- Beekes, Robert Stephen Paul (2014-08-07). Pre-Greek: phonology, morphology, lexicon. BRILL. ISBN 978-90-04-27944-5.
- Mihaylova, Biliana (2012). "The Pre-Greek Substratum Revisited". In Hejl, Christina Løye; Jacquet, Janus Bahs; Heide, Marie; Whitehead, Benedicte Nielsen; Olsen, Birgit Anette (eds.). Etymology and the European Lexicon (PDF). Copenhagen: Roots of Europe (University of Copenhagen). pp. 80–81.
- Kroonen, Gus J. (September 2012). "On the etymology of Greek ἄγλις and γέλγις 'garlic': an Akkadian loanword in Pre-Greek". Journal of Indo-European Studies. 40 (3–4): 289–299. ISSN 0092-2323.
- García Ramón, José Luis (2011). "Sprachen in Kontakt im Griechenland und Kleinasien im 2. Jahrtausend v. Chr.". Historische Mehrsprachigkeit. Shaker. pp. 23–45. ISBN 978-3-8322-9888-3. Reviews:
- Schrijver, Peter (2011). "La langue hattique et sa pertinence possible pour les contacts linguistiques préhistoriques en Europe occidentale". Contacts linguistiques dans l'Occident méditerranéen antique. Casa de Velázquez. pp. 241–255. ISBN 9788496820616.
- Verhasselt, Gertjan (2011). "The Pre-Greek linguistic substratum. A critical assessment of recent theories". Les Études Classiques. 79 (3–4): 257–283.
- Hawkins, Shane (2010-03-12). "Greek and the languages of Asia Minor to the classical period". A Companion to the Ancient Greek Language. pp. 213–227. doi:10.1002/9781444317398.ch15. ISBN 9781444317398. Reviews:
- Beekes, Robert Stephen Paul (2009). Etymological Dictionary of Greek. Leiden and Boston: Brill. ISBN 978-90-04-17418-4.
- Hajnal, Ivo; Posch, Claudia (2009). "Graeco-Anatolian Contacts in the Mycenaean Period". Sprachwissenschaft Innsbruck Institut für Sprachen und Literaturen.f=
- Yakubovich, Ilya (2009-11-15). Sociolinguistics of the Luvian language. Brill. ISBN 978-90-47-44027-7.
- Delgado, José Miguel Jiménez (2008). "Préstamos anatolios en griego antiguo" (PDF). Estudios Clásicos. 133: 7–32. Archived from the original (PDF) on 2017-03-04.
- Beekes, Robert Stephen Paul (2008). "Palatalized Consonants in Pre-Greek". Studies in Slavic and General Linguistics. 32: 45–56. JSTOR 40997492.
- De Simone, C. (2007). "9 Greek and Etruscan". In Christidis, A.-F.; Arapopoulou, Maria; Chritē, Maria (eds.). A History of Ancient Greek: From the Beginnings to Late Antiquity. Cambridge: Cambridge University Press. pp. 786–791. ISBN 978-0-521-83307-3.
- West, Martin L. (2007). Indo-European Poetry and Myth. Oxford: Oxford University Press. ISBN 978-0-19-928075-9.
- Duhoux, Y. (2007). "8 Greek and pre-Greek Languages: Introduction". In Christidis, A.-F.; Arapopoulou, Maria; Chritē, Maria (eds.). A History of Ancient Greek: From the Beginnings to Late Antiquity. Cambridge: Cambridge University Press. pp. 220–222. ISBN 9780521833073.
- Beekes, Robert Stephen Paul (2007). "Pre-Greek". Glotta. 83 (1–4): 13–17. doi:10.13109/glot.2007.83.14.13. ISSN 0017-1298.
- Duhoux, Yves (2007). "Pre-Greek Languages: Indirect Evidence". In Christidis, A.-F. (ed.). A History of Ancient Greek: From the Beginnings to Late Antiquity. Cambridge and New York: Cambridge University Press. pp. 223–228. ISBN 978-0-521-83307-3.
- Finkelberg, Margalit (2006). Greeks and Pre-Greeks: Aegean Prehistory and Greek Heroic Tradition. Cambridge: Cambridge University Press. ISBN 978-0-521-85216-6.
- García-Ramón, José Luís (2004). "Greece, Languages". In Cancik, Hubert; Schneider, Helmut (eds.). Brill's New Pauly, Vol. 5. Leiden: Brill.
- Beekes, Robert Stephen Paul (2003). The Origin of the Etruscans (PDF). ISBN 9069843692.
- Beekes, Robert Stephen Paul (2003). "The Origin of Apollo". Journal of Ancient Near Eastern Religions. 3 (1): 1–21. doi:10.1163/1569212031960384.
- Blench, Roger (1999-04-15). "The pre-Classical circum-Mediterranean world: who spoke which languages?". Archaeology and Language: Artefacts, Languages and Texts. Vol. 3 (1st ed.). ISBN 9780203202906.
- Renfrew, Colin (October 1998). "Word of Minos: the Minoan Contribution to Mycenaean Greek and the Linguistic Geography of the Bronze Age Aegean". Cambridge Archaeological Journal. 8 (2): 239–264. doi:10.1017/S0959774300001852. ISSN 0959-7743.
- Brown, Raymond A. (1985). Evidence for pre-Greek speech on Crete from Greek alphabetic sources. ISBN 9025608760.
- Furnée, Edzard Johan (1979). Vorgriechisch-Kartvelisches (in German). Leuven: Editions Peeters. ISBN 2801701149.
- Furnée, Edzard Johan (1972). Die wichtigsten konsonantischen Erscheinungen des Vorgriechischen: Mit einem Appendix über den Vokalismus. The Hague, Mouton.

Furnée’s book met with fierce criticism and was largely neglected. In my view, this was a major mistake in Greek scholarship. ... His treatment is very careful, and there are hardly any obvious mistakes. Furnée worked on it for twenty years, and even now it is the only handbook on the subject. ... Furnée went astray in two respects. First, he considered almost all variation to be of an expressive character, which is certainly wrong: it is evident that the variation found is due to the adaptation of words (or phonemes) of a foreign language to Greek. ... Secondly, Furnée was sometimes overzealous in his search for inner-Greek correspondences. ... Not every alternation necessarily points to Pre-Greek origin. The author can hardly be blamed for his enthusiasm. He was exploring new ground.

— Robert Stephen Paul Beekes, Pre-Greek: phonology, morphology, lexicon (2014)

- Ivanov Georgiev, Vladimir (1966). "Was stellt die Pelasgertheorie dar?". Lingua (16): 263–273. ISSN 0024-3841.
- Hester, D. A. (1965). ""Pelasgian"—A new Indo-European language?". Lingua. 13 (13): 335–384. doi:10.1016/0024-3841(64)90035-X. ISSN 0024-3841.
- Beattie, A.J. (1963). "Before Greek Alfred Heubeck: Praegraeca: sprachliche Untersuchungen zum vorgriechischindogermanischen Substrat. (Erlanger Forschungen, Reihe A, Band 12.) Pp. 90. Erlangen: Universitätsbibliothek, 1961. Paper". The Classical Review. 13 (2): 177–178. doi:10.1017/s0009840x00215370. S2CID 163062347.
- Heubeck, Alfred (1961). Praegraeca: sprachliche Untersuchungen zum vorgriechisch-indogermanischen Substrat (in German). Erlangen: Universitätsbund Erlangen.
- Carnoy, Albert (1960). "Les suffixes toponymiques pré-grecs". L'Antiquité classique. 29 (2): 319–336. doi:10.3406/antiq.1960.3481.
- Carnoy, Albert (1958). "Noms grecs de plantes d'origine pré-hellénique". L'Antiquité classique. 27 (2): 305–327. doi:10.3406/antiq.1958.3346.

Einleitung in die Geschichte der griechischen Sprache

- Kretschmer, Paul (1940). "Die vorgriechischen Sprach- und Volksschichten". Glotta. 28 (3–4): 231–278. ISSN 0017-1298. JSTOR 40265554.
- Kretschmer, Paul (1896). Einleitung in die Geschichte der griechischen Sprache. Göttingen, Vandenhoech.
