= Cassandra (metaphor) =

Metaphor originating from Greek mythology

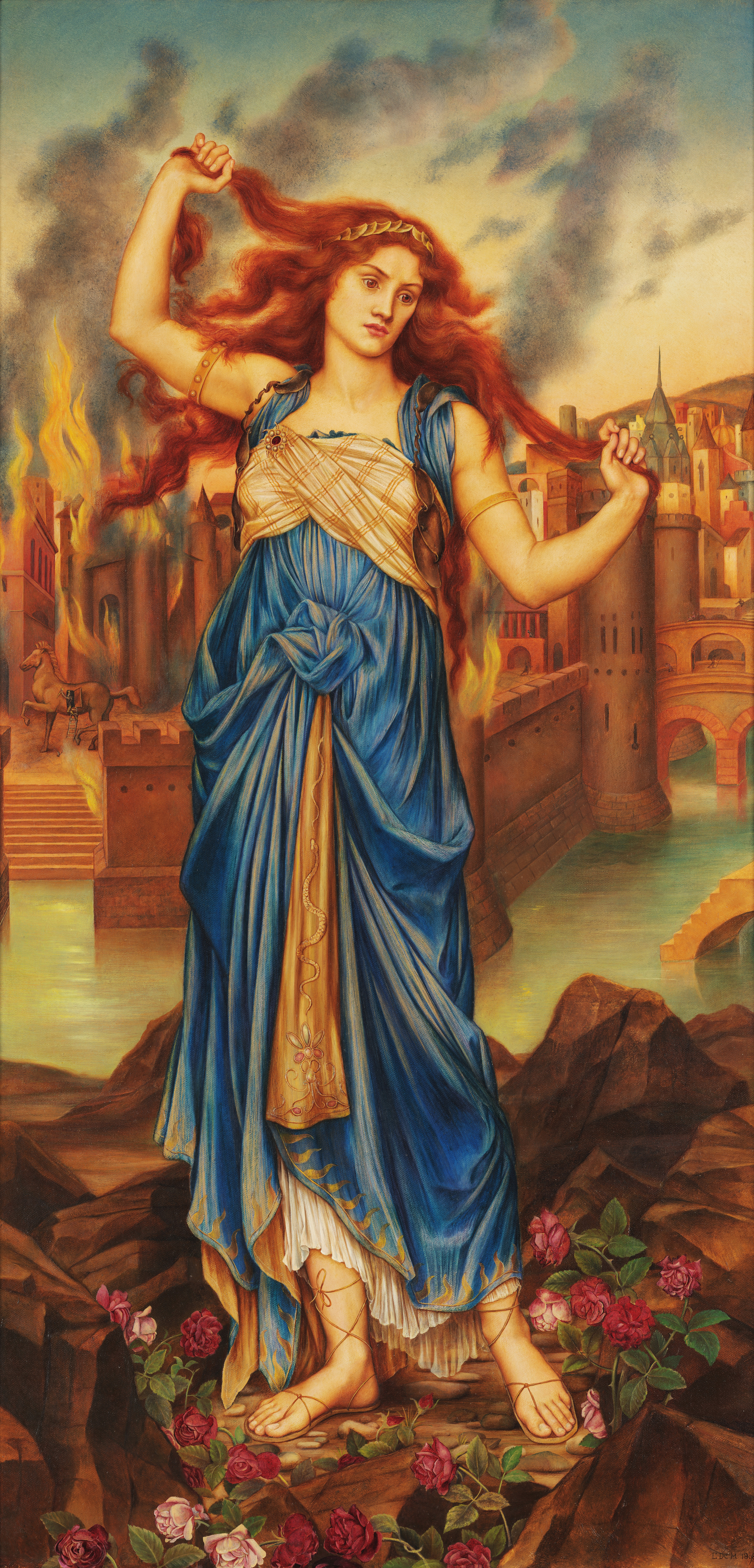
Painting of Cassandra by Evelyn De Morgan

The Cassandra metaphor (variously labeled the Cassandra "syndrome", "complex", "phenomenon", "predicament", "dilemma", "curse") relates to a person whose valid warnings or concerns are disbelieved by others.

The term originates in Greek mythology. Cassandra was a daughter of Priam, the King of Troy. Struck by her beauty, Apollo provided her with the gift of prophecy, on the condition that she agree to accept his romantic advances (or without prior agreement from Cassandra, depending on the source), but when she refused Apollo's romantic advances, he placed a curse on her, ensuring that nobody would believe her warnings. Cassandra was left with the knowledge of future events but could neither alter these events nor convince others of the validity of her predictions.

People have applied the metaphor in a variety of contexts, such as psychology, environmentalism, politics, science, cinema, the corporate world, and philosophy; it has been in circulation since at least 1914, when Charles Oman used it in his book A History of the Peninsular War, Volume 5, published in 1914. "both of them agreed to treat the Cassandra-like prophecies which French General Paul Thiébault kept sending from Salamanca as 'wild and whirling words.'" (The Oxford English Dictionary records use of "Cassandra like" from 1670 and of "Cassandra-like" from 1863.) Later, in 1949, French philosopher Gaston Bachelard coined the term "Cassandra Complex" to refer to a belief that things could be known in advance.

== Psychology ==
The Cassandra metaphor is applied by some psychologists to individuals who experience physical and emotional suffering as a result of distressing personal perceptions, and who are disbelieved when they attempt to share the cause of their suffering with others.

=== Melanie Klein ===
Psychoanalyst Melanie Klein provided an interpretation of Cassandra as representing the human moral conscience whose main task is to issue warnings. Cassandra as moral conscience "predicts ill to come and warns that punishment will follow and grief arise." Cassandra's need to point out moral infringements and subsequent social consequences is driven by what Klein calls "the destructive influences of the cruel super-ego," which is represented in the Greek myth by the god Apollo, Cassandra's overlord and persecutor. Klein's use of the metaphor centers on the moral nature of certain predictions, which tends to evoke in others "a refusal to believe what at the same time they know to be true, and expresses the universal tendency toward denial, [with] denial being a potent defence against persecutory anxiety and guilt."

=== Laurie Layton Schapira ===
In a 1988 study, Jungian analyst Laurie Layton Schapira explored what she called the "Cassandra complex" in the lives of two of her analysands.

Based on clinical experience, she delineates three factors constituting the Cassandra complex:

1. dysfunctional relationships with the "Apollo archetype",
2. emotional or physical suffering, including hysteria (conversion disorder) or "women’s problems", and
3. being disbelieved when attempting to relate the facticity of these experiences to others.

Layton Schapira views the Cassandra complex as resulting from a dysfunctional relationship with what she calls the "Apollo archetype", an archetype referring to any individual's or culture's pattern that is dedicated to, yet bound by, order, reason, intellect, truth, and clarity that disavows itself of anything occult or irrational. The intellectual specialization of this archetype creates emotional distance and can predispose relationships to a lack of emotional reciprocity and consequent dysfunctions. She further states that a "Cassandra woman" is very prone to hysteria because she "feels attacked not only from the outside world but also from within, especially from the body in the form of somatic, often gynaecological, complaints."

Addressing the metaphorical application of the Greek Cassandra myth, Layton Schapira states that:

What the Cassandra woman sees is something dark and painful that may not be apparent on the surface of things or that objective facts do not corroborate. She may envision a negative or unexpected outcome; or something which would be difficult to deal with; or a truth which others, especially authority figures, would not accept. In her frightened, ego-less state, the Cassandra woman may blurt out what she sees, perhaps with the unconscious hope that others might be able to make some sense of it. But to them her words sound meaningless, disconnected and blown out of all proportion.

=== Jean Shinoda Bolen ===
In 1989, Jean Shinoda Bolen, Clinical Professor of Psychiatry at the University of California, published an essay on the god Apollo in which she detailed a psychological profile of the "Cassandra woman" whom she suggested referred to someone suffering—as happened in the mythological relationship between Cassandra and Apollo—a dysfunctional relationship with an "Apollo man." Bolen added that the Cassandra woman may exhibit "hysterical" overtones, and may be disbelieved when attempting to share what she knows.

According to Bolen, the archetypes of Cassandra and Apollo are not gender-specific. She states that "women often find that a particular [male] god exists in them as well, just as I found that when I spoke about goddesses men could identify a part of themselves with a specific goddess. Gods and goddesses represent different qualities in the human psyche. The pantheon of Greek deities together, male and female, exist as archetypes in us all ... There are gods and goddesses in every person."

"As an archetype, Apollo personifies the aspect of the personality that wants clear definitions, is drawn to master a skill, values order and harmony, and prefers to look at the surface rather than at what underlies appearances. The Apollo archetype favors thinking over feeling, distance over closeness, objective assessment over subjective intuition."

Of what she describes as the negative Apollonic influence, Dr. Bolen writes:

Individuals who resemble Apollo have difficulties that are related to emotional distance, such as communication problems, and the inability to be intimate ... Rapport with another person is hard for the Apollo man. He prefers to access (or judge) the situation or the person from a distance, not knowing that he must "get close up"—be vulnerable and empathic—in order to truly know someone else ... But if the woman wants a deeper, more personal relationship, then there are difficulties ... she may become increasingly irrational or hysterical.

Bolen suggests that a Cassandra woman (or man) may become increasingly hysterical and irrational when in a dysfunctional relationship with a negative Apollo, and may experience others' disbelief when describing her experiences.

== Corporate world ==
Foreseeing potential future directions for a corporation or company is sometimes called "visioning", yet achieving a clear, shared vision in an organization is often difficult due to a lack of commitment to the new vision by some individuals in the organization, because it does not match reality as they see it. Those who support the new vision are termed "Cassandras"—able to see what is going to happen, but not believed. Sometimes the name Cassandra is applied to those who can predict rises, falls, and particularly crashes on the global stock market, as happened with Warren Buffett, who repeatedly warned that the 1990s stock market surge was a bubble, attracting to him the title of the "Wall Street Cassandra". Andy Grove, in his book Only the Paranoid Survive, reminds the reader of the helpful Cassandras that sense the winds of change before others and are critical to managing through Strategic Inflection Points.

== Environmental movement ==
Many environmentalists have predicted looming environmental catastrophes including climate change, rise in sea levels, irreversible pollution, and an impending collapse of ecosystems, including those of rainforests and ocean reefs. Alan Atkisson pointed out in a 1999 book that some have been labelled "Cassandras", and their warnings of impending environmental disaster are disbelieved or mocked. Atkisson says people stuck in the "Cassandra dilemma" can see negative consequences as the most likely outcome of current trends and can warn people about what is happening, but the vast majority cannot, or will not respond. Later if catastrophe occurs, they may even blame the person, as if their prediction set the disaster in motion. Atkisson believes the environmental movement has more often than not failed to convince people and avert disaster.

== Other examples ==
There are examples of the Cassandra metaphor being applied in the contexts of medical science, the media, to feminist perspectives on reality, and in politics. There are also examples of the metaphor being used in popular music lyrics, such as the 1982 ABBA song "Cassandra", Emmy the Great's "Cassandra", Florence and the Machine's "Cassandra", and Star One's "Cassandra Complex". The five-part The Mars Volta song "Cassandra Gemini" may reference this syndrome, as well as the film 12 Monkeys or in Dead and Divine's "Cassandra Syndrome". In 2024, singer-songwriter Taylor Swift recorded a song called “Cassandra” to her 11th studio album, The Tortured Poets Department, where she uses the metaphor stating that no one believed her when she was telling the truth and asking, probably the same people, if they believed in her after they “set her life in flames”. In 1998, the band Theatre of Tragedy recorded a song called “Cassandra” as the story of the myth.

== See also ==
- Martha Mitchell effect ("The Cassandra of Watergate")
- Normalcy bias
- Sentinel species ("Canary in a coalmine")
- The Boy Who Cried Wolf
