= Othryoneus =

Figure in Greek mythology

Othryoneus (Ancient Greek: Ὀθρυονεύς) is a character in Greek mythology who was the intended husband for Princess Cassandra of Troy during the Trojan War, mentioned in one passage in Homer's Iliad.

Othryoneus was from Cabesos, a Homeric site over whose location there has been disagreements since ancient times, some sources suggesting a site in the Troad self and others pointing at the very similar name of the ancient site of Kavissos, today near Feres near Evros. Othryoneus had taken part in the war in the sole purpose of marrying King Priam's daughter, the "loveliest" according to Homer, and to which the King had assented. In the Iliad, he is killed during the Battle of the Ships by Idomeneus, in a passage in which he is cited as gleefully mocking him while Othryoneus is dying.
