= Apollo archetype =

Type of innate universal psychic disposition

The Apollo archetype personifies the aspect of the personality that wants clear definitions, is drawn to master a skill, values order and harmony. The Apollo archetype favors thinking over feeling, distance over closeness, objective assessment over subjective intuition.

== Background ==
Early in the 20th century, Carl Gustav Jung sought to find a word that could describe the innate patterns of behaviour that govern our lives. Thus he introduced the term ‘archetype’ into modern psychology. Jung described archetypes as distinct themes manifesting in the fantasies and behaviour of his patients, and found these same themes visibly rendered in the arts, religions, myths, architecture, and social customs of all peoples. Because he did not want the term ‘archetypes’ to become yet another intellectual abstraction, Jung advanced various mythic images to illustrate them. For instance, the goddess Demeter is a presentation of the archetypal mother; Zeus an archetypal father; Apollo the archetypal intellectual, and so on. Jung went on to personify many archetypes by using general expressions such as 'the Great Mother’, 'Old Wise Man’, 'Shadow archetype’, etc. which have now become standard expressions in the field of analytical psychology. Jung writes “The fact that the unconscious spontaneously personifies is the reason why I have taken over these personifications in my terminology and formulated them in names”.

== Description ==
As with other archetypes, the Apollo archetype is not gender-specific. "Women often find that a particular [male] god exists in them as well, just as I found that when I spoke about goddesses men could identify a part of themselves with a specific goddess. Gods and goddesses represent different qualities in the human psyche. The pantheon of Greek deities together, male and female, exist as archetypes in us all… There are gods and goddesses in every person."

In addition to the many positive aspects of the Apollo archetype such as order, reason, moderation, harmoniousness, and unemotional perfection, archetypal psychologist James Hillman suggests that the archetype may also manifest as a negative potential if it becomes overly dominant: "Apollo certainly presents a pattern that is disastrous, destructive for psychological life, cut off from everything that has to do with feminine ways, whether Cassandra or Creusa or Daphne – whomever he touches goes wrong – so that you have the feeling that Apollo simply doesn't belong where there is psyche."

Of what she describes as the negative Apollonic influence, psychiatrist Jean Shinoda Bolen writes:

Individuals who resemble Apollo have difficulties that are related to emotional distance, such as communication problems, and the inability to be intimate… Rapport with another person is hard for the Apollo man. He prefers to access (or judge) the situation or the person from a distance, not knowing that he must "get close up" – be vulnerable and empathic – in order to truly know someone else…. But if the woman wants a deeper, more personal relationship, then there are difficulties… she may become increasingly irrational or hysterical.
