= Albert Carnoy =

Belgian politician and academic (1878–1961)

Albert Joseph Carnoy
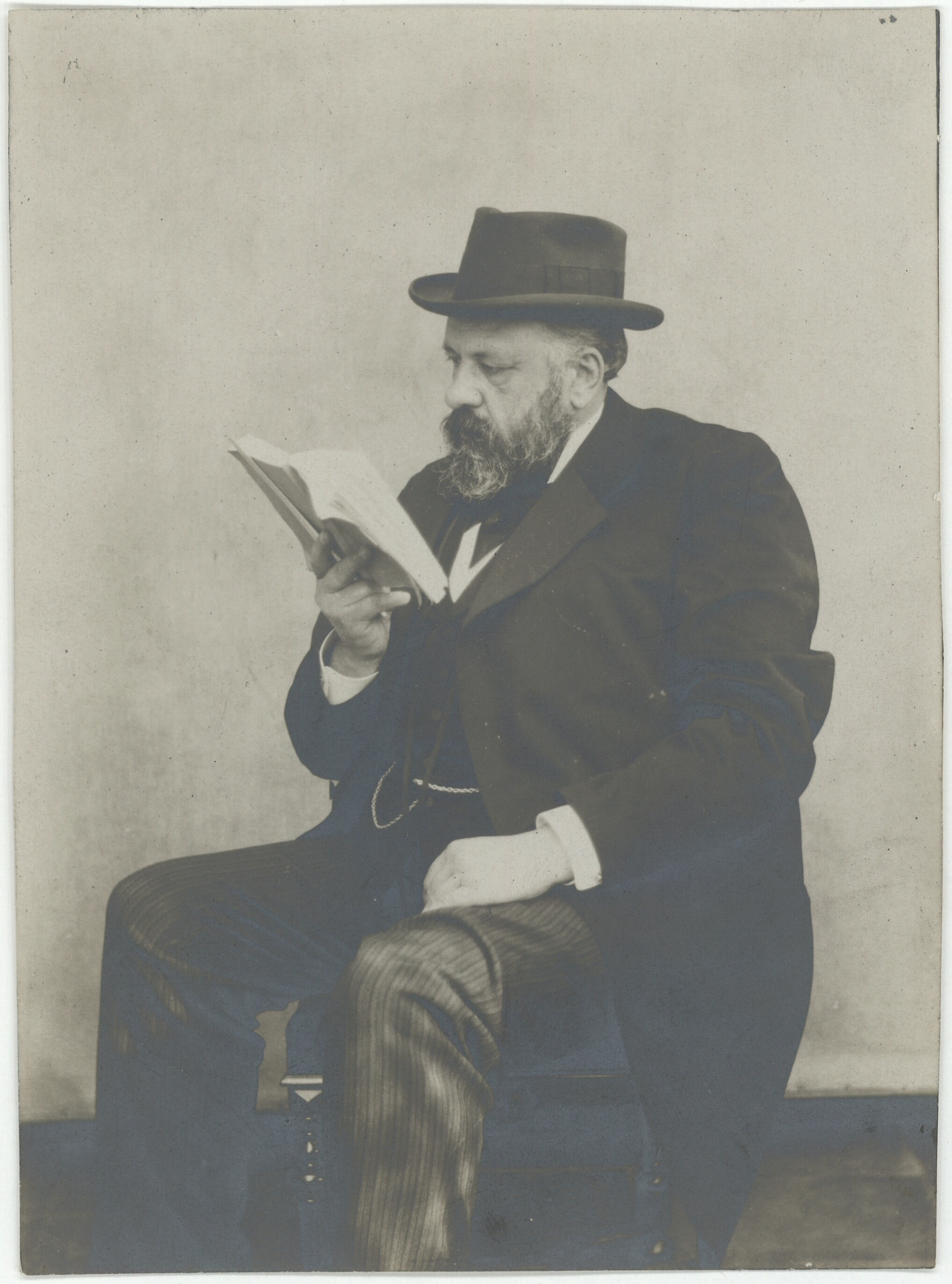
- Carnoy in 1930
- Born: November 7, 1878
- Died: January 12, 1961 (aged 82)

Albert Joseph Carnoy (7 November 1878 – 12 January 1961) was a Belgian politician and academic.

He obtained his doctorate in Romance philology in 1901 and in classical philology in 1902. His research focused on the etymology of Indo-European languages and, in particular, on the study of Indo-Iranian languages.
