= Seven-number summary =

In descriptive statistics, the seven-number summary is a collection of seven summary statistics, and is an extension of the five-number summary. There are three common forms, all based on percentiles evaluated at different percentage values.

As with the five-number summary, it can be represented by a modified box plot, adding hatch-marks on the "whiskers" for two of the additional numbers.

== Seven-number summary ==
The following percentiles are (approximately) evenly spaced under a normally distributed variable:

Normal distribution seven summary numbers
| Nr. | Approximate percentile | More precise percentile | Position | Alternate name(s) |
|---|---|---|---|---|
| #7 | 98th | 97.85% | upper whisker top end |
| #6 | 91st | 91.13% | upper whisker crosshatch |
| #5 | 75th | 75.00% | box upper edge | upper quartile or third quartile |
| #4 | 50th | 50.00% | box bisector / mid-line | median, middle value, or second quartile |
| #3 | 25th | 25.00% | box lower edge | lower quartile or first quartile |
| #2 | 9th | 8.87% | lower whisker crosshatch |
| #1 | 2nd | 2.15% | lower whisker bottom end |

The middle three values – the lower quartile, median, and upper quartile – are the usual statistics from the five-number summary and are the standard values for the box in a box plot.

The two unusual percentiles at either end are used because the locations of all seven values will be approximately equally spaced if the data is normally distributed. (Note: The seven equally spaced percentiles with three digits of precision are 2.15%, 8.87%, 25.0%, 50.0%, 75.0%, 91.13%, and 97.85% . If one desires to identify a symmetric distribution different from the normal, or Gaussian distribution, the listed outer pairs of quantiles (2.15% and 8.87% on the lower whisker, and on the upper whisker 91.13% and 97.85%) may be replaced by quantiles from the other desired distribution whose argument spacing has been calculated to match the spacing between the median and the quartiles.) Some statistical tests require normally distributed data, so the plotted values provide a convenient visual check for validity of later tests, simply by scanning to see if the marks for those seven percentiles appear to be equal distances apart on the plot.

Notice that whereas the extreme values of the five-number summary depend on the number of samples, this seven-number summary does not, and is somewhat more stable, since its whisker-ends are protected from the usual wild swings in the extreme values of the sample by replacing them with the more steady 2nd and 98th percentiles.

The values can be represented using a modified box plot. The 2nd and 98th percentiles are represented by the ends of the whiskers, and hatch-marks across the whiskers mark the 9th and 91st percentiles.

== Bowley’s seven-figure summary ==
Arthur Bowley used a set of non-parametric statistics, called a "seven-figure summary", including the extremes, deciles, and quartiles, along with the median.

Thus the numbers are:

Bowley’s seven summary figures
| Nr. | Percentile | Alternate name(s) |
|---|---|---|
| #1 | 0% | sample minimum (nominal: highest zero-th percentile) |
| #2 | 10% | first decile |
| #3 | 25% | lower quartile or first quartile |
| #4 | 50% | median, middle value, or second quartile |
| #5 | 75% | upper quartile or third quartile |
| #6 | 90% | last decile |
| #7 | 100% | sample maximum (nominal: lowest hundredth percentile) |

Note that the middle five of the seven numbers are very nearly the same as for the seven number summary, above.

The addition of the deciles allow one to compute the interdecile range, which for a normal distribution can be scaled to give a reasonably efficient estimate of standard deviation, and the 10% midsummary, which when compared to the median gives an idea of the skewness in the tails.

== Tukey’s seven-number summary ==
John Tukey used a seven-number summary consisting of the extremes, octiles, quartiles, and the median.

The seven numbers are:

Tukey’s seven summary figures
| Nr. | Percentile | Alternate name(s) |
|---|---|---|
| #1 | 0% | sample minimum (nominal: highest zero-th percentile) |
| #2 | 12.5% | first octile |
| #3 | 25.0% | lower quartile or first quartile |
| #4 | 50.0% | median, middle value, or second quartile |
| #5 | 75.0% | upper quartile or third quartile |
| #6 | 87.5% | last octile |
| #7 | 100% | sample maximum (nominal: lowest hundredth percentile) |

Note that the middle five of the seven numbers can all be obtained by successive partitioning of the ordered data into subsets of equal size. Extending the seven-number summary by continued partitioning produces the nine-number summary, the eleven-number summary, and so on.

== See also ==
- Three-point estimation
- Stanine
