= Expectile =

In the mathematical theory of probability, the expectiles of a probability distribution are related to the expected value of the distribution in a way analogous to that in which the quantiles of the distribution are related to the median.

For $\tau \in (0,1)$, the expectile $t$ at level $\tau$ of the probability distribution with cumulative distribution function $F$ is uniquely characterized by any of the following equivalent conditions:

$$\begin{align}
& (1-\tau)\int^t_{-\infty}(t-x) \, dF(x) = \tau\int^\infty_t(x-t) \, dF(x); \\[5pt]
& \int^t_{-\infty}|t-x| \, dF(x) = \tau\int^\infty_{-\infty}|x-t| \, dF(x); \\[5pt]
& t-\operatorname E[X]=\frac{2\tau-1}{1-\tau} \int^\infty_t(x-t) \, dF(x).
\end{align}$$

Quantile regression minimizes an asymmetric $L_1$ loss (see least absolute deviations):

$$\begin{align}
\operatorname{quantile}(\tau) &\in \operatorname{argmin}_{t \in \mathbb{R}} \operatorname{E}[|X - t| |\tau - H(t - X)|],
\end{align}$$

where $H$ is the Heaviside step function; analogously, expectile regression minimizes an asymmetric $L_2$ loss (see ordinary least squares):

$$\begin{align}
\operatorname{expectile}(\tau) &\in \operatorname{argmin}_{t \in \mathbb{R}} \operatorname{E}[|X - t|^2 |\tau - H(t - X)|].
\end{align}$$
