= Three-point estimation =

Technique used in management and information systems

The three-point estimation technique is used in management and information systems applications for the construction of an approximate probability distribution representing the outcome of future events, based on very limited information. While the distribution used for the approximation might be a normal distribution, this is not always so. For example, a triangular distribution might be used, depending on the application.

In three-point estimation, three figures are produced initially for every distribution that is required, based on prior experience or best-guesses:

- a = the best-case estimate
- m = the most likely estimate
- b = the worst-case estimate

These are then combined to yield either a full probability distribution, for later combination with distributions obtained similarly for other variables, or summary descriptors of the distribution, such as the mean, standard deviation or percentage points of the distribution. The accuracy attributed to the results derived can be no better than the accuracy inherent in the three initial points, and there are clear dangers in using an assumed form for an underlying distribution that itself has little basis.

== Estimation ==
Based on the assumption that a PERT distribution governs the data, several estimates are possible. These values are used to calculate an E value for the estimate and a standard deviation (SD) as L-estimators, where:

E = (a + 4m + b) / 6
SD = (b − a) / 6

E is a weighted average which takes into account both the most optimistic and most pessimistic estimates provided. SD measures the variability or uncertainty in the estimate. In Program Evaluation and Review Techniques (PERT) the three values are used to fit a PERT distribution for Monte Carlo simulations.

The triangular distribution is also commonly used. It differs from the double-triangular by its simple triangular shape and by the property that the mode does not have to coincide with the median. The mean (expected value) is then:

E = (a + m + b) / 3.

In some applications, the triangular distribution is used directly as an estimated probability distribution, rather than for the derivation of estimated statistics.

== Project management ==
To produce a project estimate the project manager:

- Decomposes the project into a list of estimable tasks, i.e. a work breakdown structure
- Estimates the expected value E(task) and the standard deviation SD(task) of this estimate for each task time
- Calculates the expected value for the total project work time as $\operatorname{E}(\text{project}) = \sum{ \operatorname{E}(\text{task})}$
- Calculates the value SD(project) for the standard error of the estimated total project work time as: $\operatorname{SD}(\text{project}) = \sqrt{\sum{\operatorname{SD}(\text{task})^2}}$ under the assumption that the project work time estimates are uncorrelated

The E and SD values are then used to convert the project time estimates to confidence intervals as follows:

- The 68% confidence interval for the true project work time is approximately E(project) ± SD(project)
- The 90% confidence interval for the true project work time is approximately E(project) ± 1.645 × SD(project)
- The 95% confidence interval for the true project work time is approximately E(project) ± 2 × SD(project)
- The 99.7% confidence interval for the true project work time is approximately E(project) ± 3 × SD(project)
- Information Systems typically uses the 95% confidence interval for all project and task estimates.

These confidence interval estimates assume that the data from all of the tasks combine to be approximately normal (see asymptotic normality). Typically, there would need to be 20–30 tasks for this to be reasonable, and each of the estimates E for the individual tasks would have to be unbiased.

== See also ==
- Five-number summary
- Seven-number summary
- Program Evaluation and Review Technique (PERT)
