= Decile =

Quantile dividing data into 10 equal parts

In descriptive statistics, a decile is any of the nine values that divide the sorted data into ten equal parts, so that each part represents 1/10 of the sample or population. A decile is one possible form of a quantile; others include the quartile and percentile. A decile rank arranges the data in order from lowest to highest and is done on a scale of one to ten where each successive number corresponds to an increase of 10 percentage points.

== Decile mean ==
A moderately robust measure of central tendency, known as the decile mean, can be computed by making use of a sample's deciles $D_{1}$ to $D_{9}$ ($D_{1}$ = 10th percentile, $D_{2}$ = 20th percentile and so on). It is calculated as follows:

$$DM = \frac{\sum_{i=1}^9 D_{i}} {9}$$

Apart from serving as an alternative for the mean and the truncated mean, it also forms the basis for robust measures of skewness and kurtosis, and even a normality test.

== See also ==
- Summary statistics
- Socio-economic decile (for New Zealand schools)
