= Violin plot =

Method of plotting numeric data

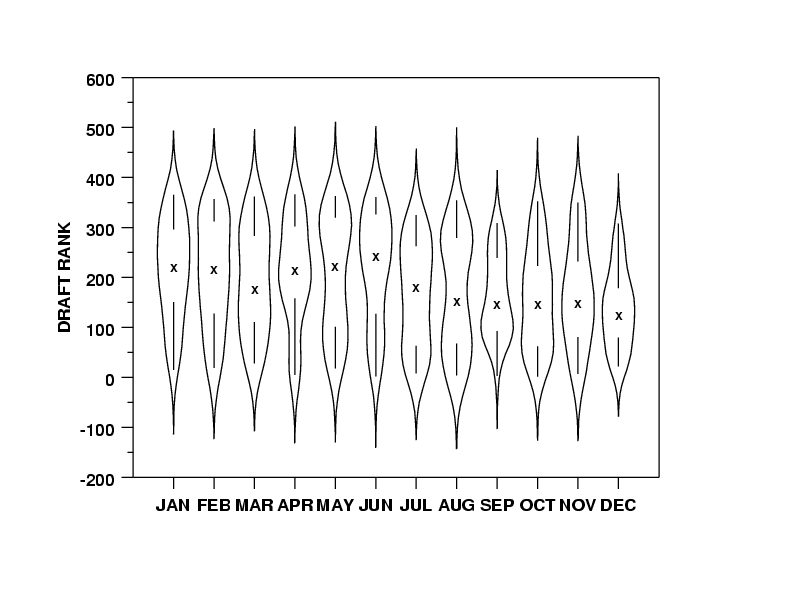
Example of a violin plot

Example of a violin plot in a scientific publication in PLOS Pathogens.

A violin plot (also known as a bean plot) is a statistical graphic for comparing probability distributions. It is similar to a box plot, but has enhanced information with the addition of a rotated kernel density plot on each side.

== History ==
The violin plot was proposed in 1997 by Jerry L. Hintze and Ray D. Nelson as a way to display even more information than box plots, which were created by John Tukey in 1977. The name comes from the plot's alleged resemblance to a violin.

== Description ==
Violin plots are similar to box plots, except that they also show the probability density of the data at different values, usually smoothed by a kernel density estimator. A violin plot will include all the data that is in a box plot: a marker for the median of the data; a box or marker indicating the interquartile range; and possibly all sample points, if the number of samples is not too high.

While a box plot shows a summary statistics such as median and interquartile ranges, the violin plot shows the full distribution of the data. The violin plot can be used in multimodal data (more than one peak). In this case a violin plot shows the presence of different peaks, their position and relative amplitude.

Like box plots, violin plots are used to represent comparison of a variable distribution (or sample distribution) across different "categories" (for example, temperature distribution compared between day and night, or distribution of car prices compared across different car makers).

A violin plot can have multiple layers. For instance, the outer shape represents all possible results. The next layer inside might represent the values that occur 95% of the time. The next layer (if it exists) inside might represent the values that occur 50% of the time.

Violin plots are less popular than box plots. Violin plots may be harder to understand for readers not familiar with them. In this case, a more accessible alternative is to plot a series of stacked histograms or kernel density plots.

The original meaning of "violin plot" was a combination of a box plot and a two-sided kernel density plot. However, currently "violin plots" are sometimes understood just as two-sided kernel density plots, without a box plot or any other elements.

== See also ==
- Sina plot
- Box plot
