= Percentile rank =

Statistic of a given score

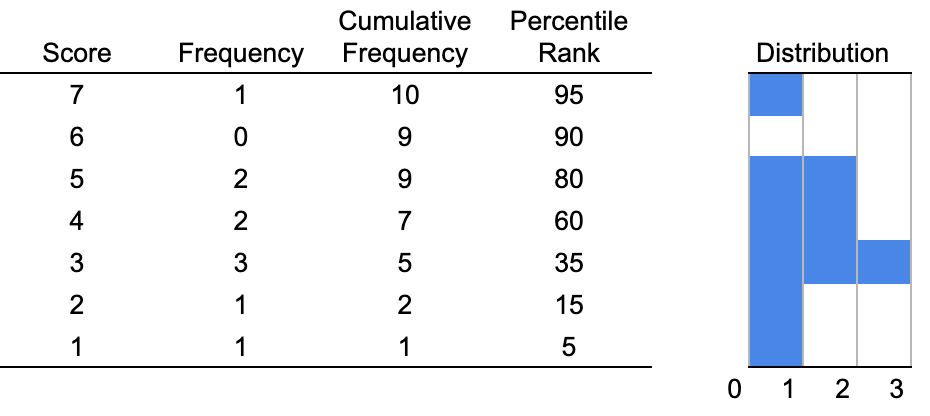
Percentile ranks (PR) for a distribution of 10 scores

In statistics, the percentile rank (PR) of a given score is the percentage of scores in its frequency distribution that are less than that score.

== Formulation ==
Its mathematical formula is

$$PR = \frac{CF - (0.5 \times F)}{N} \times 100,$$

where CF—the cumulative frequency—is the count of all scores less than or equal to the score of interest, F is the frequency for the score of interest, and N is the number of scores in the distribution. Alternatively, if CF' is the count of all scores less than the score of interest, then

$$PR = \frac{CF' + (0.5 \times F)}{N} \times 100.$$

== Example ==
The figure illustrates the percentile rank computation and shows how the 0.5 × F term in the formula ensures that the percentile rank reflects a percentage of scores less than the specified score. For example, for the 10 scores shown in the figure, 60% of them are below a score of 4 (five less than 4 and half of the two equal to 4) and 95% are below 7 (nine less than 7 and half of the one equal to 7). Occasionally the percentile rank of a score is mistakenly defined as the percentage of scores lower than or equal to it, but that would require a different computation, one with the 0.5 × F term deleted. Typically percentile ranks are only computed for scores in the distribution but, as the figure illustrates, percentile ranks can also be computed for scores whose frequency is zero. For example, 90% of the scores are less than 6 (nine less than 6, none equal 6).

== Usage ==
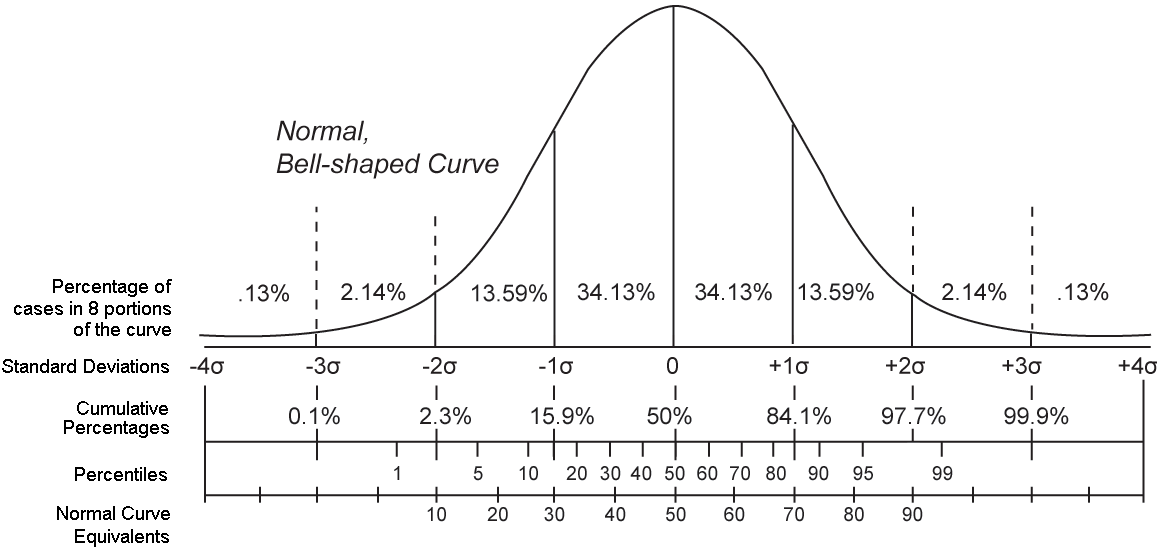
Percentile ranks (PRs or percentiles) compared to Normal curve equivalents (NCEs)

In educational measurement, a range of percentile ranks, often appearing on a score report, shows the range within which the test taker's "true" percentile rank probably occurs. The "true" value refers to the rank the test taker would obtain if there were no random errors involved in the testing process.

Percentile ranks are commonly used to clarify the interpretation of scores on standardized tests. For the test theory, the percentile rank of a raw score is interpreted as the percentage of examinees in the norm group who scored below the score of interest.

== Caveats ==
Percentile ranks are not on an equal-interval scale; that is, the difference between any two scores is not the same as between any other two scores whose difference in percentile ranks is the same. For example, 50 − 25 = 25 is not the same distance as 60 − 35 = 25 because of the bell-curve shape of the distribution. Some percentile ranks are closer to some than others. Percentile rank 30 is closer on the bell curve to 40 than it is to 20. If the distribution is normally distributed, the percentile rank can be inferred from the standard score.

== See also ==
- Quantile
- Percentile
- Ranking
