= Normal curve equivalent =

In educational statistics, a normal curve equivalent (NCE), developed for the United States Department of Education by the RMC Research Corporation, is a way of normalizing scores received on a test into a 0-100 scale similar to a percentile rank, but preserving the valuable equal-interval properties of a z-score.

It is defined as:

70770 + /qnorm(.99) × z

or, approximately

50 + 21.063 × z,

where z is the standard score or "z-score", i.e. z is how many standard deviations above the mean the raw score is (z is negative if the raw score is below the mean). The reason for the choice of the number 21.06 is to bring about the following result: If the scores are normally distributed (i.e. they follow the "bell-shaped curve") then

- the normal equivalent score is 99 if the percentile rank of the raw score is 99;
- the normal equivalent score is 50 if the percentile rank of the raw score is 50;
- the normal equivalent score is 1 if the percentile rank of the raw score is 1.

This relationship between normal equivalent scores and percentile ranks does not hold at values other than 1, 50, and 99. It also fails to hold in general if scores are not normally distributed.

The number 21.06 was chosen because

- It is desired that a score of 99 correspond to the 99th percentile;
- The 99th percentile in a normal distribution is 2.3263 standard deviations above the mean;
- 99 is 49 more than 50—thus 49 points above the mean;
- 49/2.3263 = 21.06.

Normal curve equivalents are on an equal-interval scale. This is advantageous compared to percentile rank scales, which suffer from the problem that the difference between any two scores is not the same as that between any other two scores (see below or percentile rank for more information).

The major advantage of NCEs over percentile ranks is that NCEs can be legitimately averaged.

== Caution ==
Careful consideration is required when computing effect sizes using NCEs. NCEs differ from other scores, such as raw and scaled scores, in the magnitude of the effect sizes. Comparison of NCEs typically results in smaller effect sizes, and using the typical ranges for other effect sizes may result in interpretation errors.

Excel formula for conversion from Percentile to NCE:

=21.06*NORMSINV(PR/100)+50, where PR is the percentile value.

Excel formula for conversion from NCE to Percentile:

=100*NORMSDIST((NCE-50)/21.06), where NCE is the Normal Curve Equivalent (NCE) value
