= Sina plot =

Type of diagram

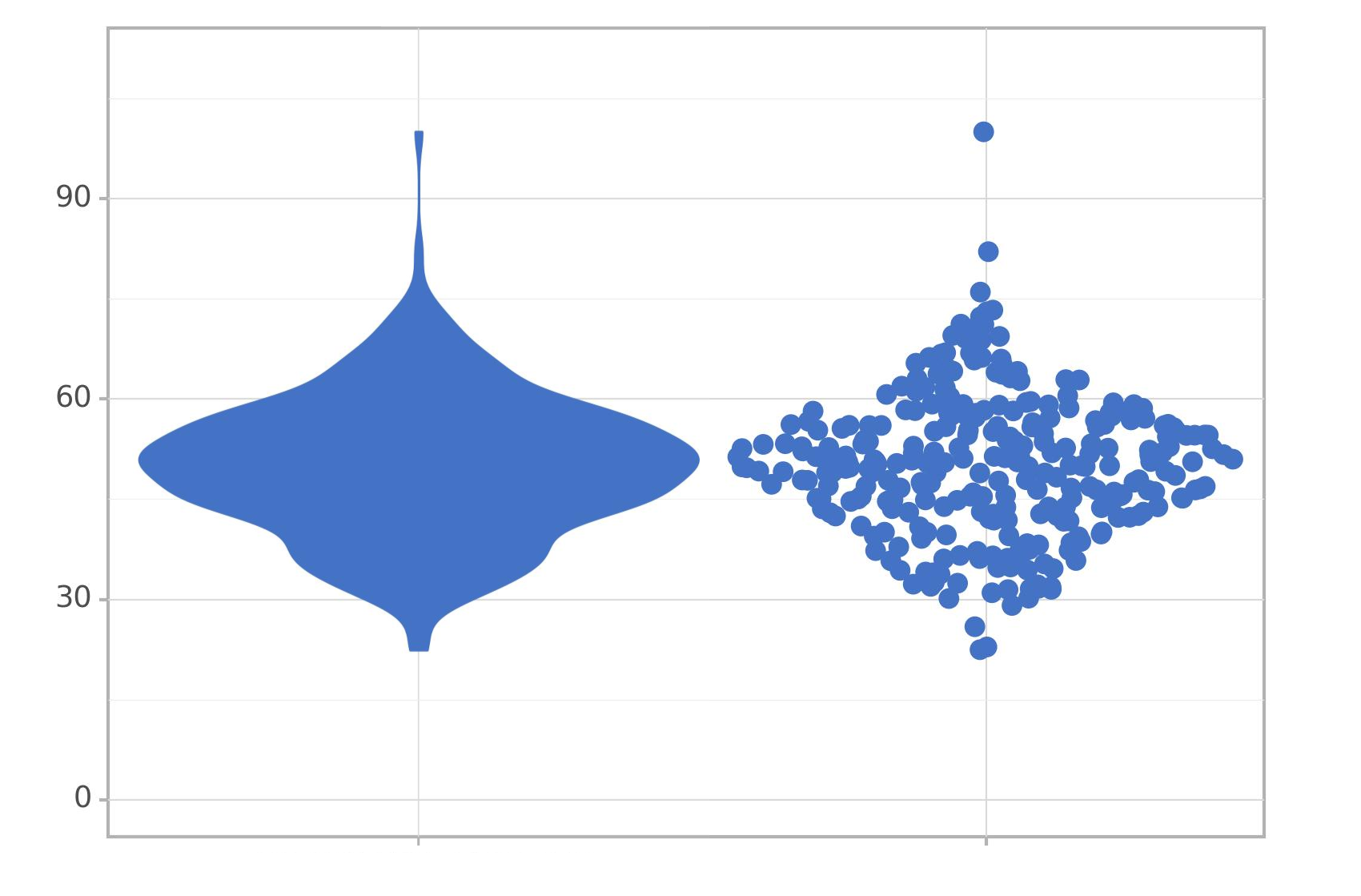
A violin plot (on the left) and a sina plot (on the right) for the same sample.

A sina plot is a type of diagram in which numerical data are depicted by points distributed in such a way that the width of the point distribution is proportional to the kernel density. Sina plots are similar to violin plots, but while violin plots depict kernel density, sina plots depict the points themselves. In some situations, sina plots may be preferable to violin plots, because sina plots contain more information.

The term "sina plot" is intended to recognize the contributions of Sina Hadi Sohi, a student at the University of Copenhagen in Denmark. Sina created the original code that researchers at the university used to generate these plots.

There are a number of ways to create sina plots, in particular:

- The ggplot2 library of the R programming language used together with the ggforce package.
- The sinaplot library of the R programming language.
- The plotnine library of the Python programming language.

== See also ==
- Violin plot
- Box plot
