= Summary statistics =

Type of statistics

Box plot of the Michelson–Morley experiment, showing several summary statistics.

In descriptive statistics, summary statistics are used to summarize a set of observations, in order to communicate the largest amount of information as simply as possible. Statisticians commonly try to describe the observations in

- a measure of location, or central tendency, such as the arithmetic mean
- a measure of statistical dispersion like the standard mean absolute deviation
- a measure of the shape of the distribution like skewness or kurtosis
- if more than one variable is measured, a measure of statistical dependence such as a correlation coefficient

A common collection of order statistics used as summary statistics are the five-number summary, sometimes extended to a seven-number summary, and the associated box plot.

Entries in an analysis of variance table can also be regarded as summary statistics.

== Examples ==
=== Location ===
Common measures of location, or central tendency, are the arithmetic mean, median, mode, and interquartile mean.

=== Spread ===
Common measures of statistical dispersion are the standard deviation, variance, range, interquartile range, absolute deviation, mean absolute difference and the distance standard deviation. Measures that assess spread in comparison to the typical size of data values include the coefficient of variation.

The Gini coefficient was originally developed to measure income inequality and is equivalent to one of the L-moments.

A simple summary of a dataset is sometimes given by quoting particular order statistics as approximations to selected percentiles of a distribution.

=== Shape ===
Common measures of the shape of a distribution are skewness or kurtosis, while alternatives can be based on L-moments. A different measure is the distance skewness, for which a value of zero implies central symmetry.

=== Dependence ===
The common measure of dependence between paired random variables is the Pearson product-moment correlation coefficient, while a common alternative summary statistic is Spearman's rank correlation coefficient. A value of zero for the distance correlation implies independence.

== Human perception of summary statistics ==
Humans efficiently use summary statistics to quickly perceive the gist of auditory and visual information.

== See also ==
- Five-number summary
- Seven-number summary
- Common test statistics
- Descriptive statistics
- Sample statistics
- Sufficient statistic
- Data processing
