= Quartile coefficient of dispersion =

Normalized measure of statistical dispersion

In descriptive statistics, the quartile coefficient of dispersion (QCD) is a normalized measure of dispersion and is used to make comparisons within and between data sets. Since it is based on quantile information, it is a more robust to outliers than measures such as the coefficient of variation. As such, it is one of several robust measures of scale.

The statistic is easily computed using the first and third quartiles (Q_{1} and Q_{3}). The quartile coefficient of dispersion is the ratio of half of the difference of quartiles (the interquartile range, IQR) to the average of the quartiles (the midhinge, MH):
$$\begin{align}
\mathrm{QCD} &= {1\over 2} {IQR \over MH} \\
&= {1\over 2} \frac{\left(Q_3 - Q_1\right)}{\frac{Q_3 + Q_1}{2}} \\
&= {Q_3 - Q_1 \over Q_3 + Q_1}.
\end{align}$$

== Example ==
Consider the following two data sets:

A = {2, 4, 6, 8, 10, 12, 14}

n = 7, range = 12, mean = 8, median = 8, Q_{1} = 4, Q_{3} = 12, quartile coefficient of dispersion = 0.5

B = {1.8, 2, 2.1, 2.4, 2.6, 2.9, 3}

n = 7, range = 1.2, mean = 2.4, median = 2.4, Q_{1} = 2, Q_{3} = 2.9, quartile coefficient of dispersion = 0.18

The quartile coefficient of dispersion of data set A is 2.7 times as great (0.5 / 0.18) as that of data set B.

== See also ==
- Robust measures of scale
- Coefficient of variation
- Interquartile range
- Median absolute deviation
