= Mid-range =

Arithmetic mean of the maximum and the minimum

In statistics, the mid-range or mid-extreme is a measure of central tendency of a sample defined as the arithmetic mean of the maximum and minimum values of the data set:

$$M=\frac{\max x + \min x}{2}.$$

The mid-range is closely related to the range, a measure of statistical dispersion defined as the difference between maximum and minimum values. The two measures are complementary in sense that if one knows the mid-range and the range, one can find the sample maximum and minimum values.

The mid-range is rarely used in practical statistical analysis, as it lacks efficiency as an estimator for most distributions of interest, because it ignores all intermediate points, and lacks robustness, as outliers change it significantly. Indeed, for many distributions it is one of the least efficient and least robust statistics. However, it finds some use in special cases: it is the maximally efficient estimator for the center of a uniform distribution, trimmed mid-ranges address robustness, and as an L-estimator, it is simple to understand and compute.

== Robustness ==
The midrange is highly sensitive to outliers and ignores all but two data points. It is therefore a very non-robust statistic, having a breakdown point of 0, meaning that a single observation can change it arbitrarily. Further, it is highly influenced by outliers: increasing the sample maximum or decreasing the sample minimum by x changes the mid-range by $x/2,$ while it changes the sample mean, which also has breakdown point of 0, by only $x/n.$ It is thus of little use in practical statistics, unless outliers are already handled.

A trimmed midrange is known as a midsummary – the n% trimmed midrange is the average of the n% and (100−n)% percentiles, and is more robust, having a breakdown point of n%. In the middle of these is the midhinge, which is the 25% midsummary. The median can be interpreted as the fully trimmed (50%) mid-range; this accords with the convention that the median of an even number of points is the mean of the two middle points.

These trimmed midranges are also of interest as descriptive statistics or as L-estimators of central location or skewness: differences of midsummaries, such as midhinge minus the median, give measures of skewness at different points in the tail.

== Efficiency ==
Despite its drawbacks, in some cases it is useful: the midrange is a highly efficient estimator of μ, given a small sample of a sufficiently platykurtic distribution, but it is inefficient for mesokurtic distributions, such as the normal.

For example, for a continuous uniform distribution with unknown maximum and minimum, the mid-range is the uniformly minimum-variance unbiased estimator (UMVU) estimator for the mean. The sample maximum and sample minimum, together with sample size, are a sufficient statistic for the population maximum and minimum – the distribution of other samples, conditional on a given maximum and minimum, is just the uniform distribution between the maximum and minimum and thus add no information. See German tank problem for further discussion. Thus the mid-range, which is an unbiased and sufficient estimator of the population mean, is in fact the UMVU: using the sample mean just adds noise based on the uninformative distribution of points within this range.

Conversely, for the normal distribution, the sample mean is the UMVU estimator of the mean. Thus for platykurtic distributions, which can often be thought of as between a uniform distribution and a normal distribution, the informativeness of the middle sample points versus the extrema values varies from "equal" for normal to "uninformative" for uniform, and for different distributions, one or the other (or some combination thereof) may be most efficient. A robust analog is the trimean, which averages the midhinge (25% trimmed mid-range) and median.

=== Small samples ===
For small sample sizes (n from 4 to 20) drawn from a sufficiently platykurtic distribution (negative excess kurtosis, defined as γ_{2} = (μ_{4}/(μ_{2})²) − 3), the mid-range is an efficient estimator of the mean μ. The following table summarizes empirical data comparing three estimators of the mean for distributions of varied kurtosis; the modified mean is the truncated mean, where the maximum and minimum are eliminated.

Excess kurtosis (γ_{2})	Most efficient estimator of μ
−1.2 to −0.8	Midrange
−0.8 to 2.0	Mean
2.0 to 6.0	Modified mean

For n = 1 or 2, the midrange and the mean are equal (and coincide with the median), and are most efficient for all distributions. For n = 3, the modified mean is the median, and instead the mean is the most efficient measure of central tendency for values of γ_{2} from 2.0 to 6.0 as well as from −0.8 to 2.0.

== Sampling properties ==
For a sample of size n from the standard normal distribution, the mid-range M is unbiased, and has a variance given by:

$$\operatorname{var}(M)=\frac{\pi^2}{24 \ln(n)}.$$

For a sample of size n from the standard Laplace distribution, the mid-range M is unbiased, and has a variance given by:

$$\operatorname{var}(M)=\frac{\pi^2}{12}$$

and, in particular, the variance does not decrease to zero as the sample size grows.

For a sample of size n from a zero-centred uniform distribution, the mid-range M is unbiased, nM has an asymptotic distribution which is a Laplace distribution.

== Deviation ==
While the mean of a set of values minimizes the sum of squares of deviations and the median minimizes the average absolute deviation, the midrange minimizes the maximum deviation (defined as $\max\left|x_i-m\right|$): it is a solution to a variational problem.

== See also ==
- Range (statistics)
- Midhinge
