= Interdecile range =

Statistical measure

In statistics, the interdecile range is the difference between the first and the ninth deciles (10% and 90%). The interdecile range is a measure of statistical dispersion of the values in a set of data, similar to the range and the interquartile range, and can be computed from the (non-parametric) seven-number summary.

Despite its simplicity, the interdecile range of a sample drawn from a normal distribution can be divided by 2.56 to give a reasonably efficient estimator of the standard deviation of a normal distribution. This is derived from the fact that the lower (respectively upper) decile of a normal distribution with arbitrary variance is equal to the mean minus (respectively, plus) 1.28 times the standard deviation.

A more efficient estimator is given by instead taking the 7% trimmed range (the difference between the 7th and 93rd percentiles) and dividing by 3 (corresponding to 86% of the data falling within ±1.5 standard deviations of the mean in a normal distribution); this yields an estimator having about 65% efficiency. Analogous measures of location are given by the median, midhinge, and trimean (or statistics based on nearby points).

== See also ==
- Interquartile range
- Robust measures of scale
- Standard deviation
- Statistical analysis
