= Average absolute deviation =

Summary statistic of variability

The average absolute deviation (AAD) of a data set is the average of the absolute deviations from a central point. It is a summary statistic of statistical dispersion or variability. In the general form, the central point can be a mean, median, mode, or the result of any other measure of central tendency or any reference value related to the given data set. AAD includes the mean absolute deviation and the median absolute deviation (both abbreviated as MAD). When the central value is replaced by zero, AAD corresponds to the average absolute value or mean absolute value.

== Measures of dispersion ==
Several measures of statistical dispersion are defined in terms of the absolute deviation. The term "average absolute deviation" does not uniquely identify a measure of statistical dispersion, as there are several measures that can be used to measure absolute deviations, and there are several measures of central tendency that can be used as well. Thus to uniquely identify the absolute deviation it is necessary to specify both the measure of deviation and the measure of central tendency. The statistical literature has not yet adopted a standard notation, as both the mean absolute deviation around the mean and the median absolute deviation around the median have been denoted by their initials "MAD" in the literature, which may lead to confusion, since they generally have values considerably different from each other.

== Mean absolute deviation around a central point ==
The mean absolute deviation of a set X = {x_{1}, x_{2}, …, x_{n}} is:
$$\frac{1}{n} \sum_{i=1}^n |x_i-m(X)|.$$

The choice of measure of central tendency, $m(X)$, has a marked effect on the value of the mean deviation. For example, for the data set {2, 2, 3, 4, 14}:

Measure of central tendency $m(X)$	Mean absolute deviation
Arithmetic Mean = 5	$\frac{|2 - 5| + |2 - 5| + |3 - 5| + |4 - 5| + |14 - 5|}{5} = 3.6$
Median = 3	$\frac{|2 - 3| + |2 - 3| + |3 - 3| + |4 - 3| + |14 - 3|}{5} = 2.8$
Mode = 2	$\frac{|2 - 2| + |2 - 2| + |3 - 2| + |4 - 2| + |14 - 2|}{5} = 3.0$

=== Mean absolute deviation around the mean ===
The mean absolute deviation (MAD), also referred to as the "mean deviation" or sometimes "average absolute deviation", is the mean of the data's absolute deviations around the data's mean: the average (absolute) distance from the mean. "Average absolute deviation" can refer to either this usage, or to the general form with respect to a specified central point (see above).

MAD has been proposed to be used in place of standard deviation since it corresponds better to real life. Because the MAD is a simpler measure of variability than the standard deviation, it can be useful in school teaching.

This method's forecast accuracy is very closely related to the mean squared error (MSE) method which is just the average squared error of the forecasts. Although these methods are very closely related, MAD is more commonly used because it is both easier to compute (avoiding the need for squaring) and easier to understand.

==== Relation to standard deviation ====
For the normal distribution, the ratio of mean absolute deviation from the mean to standard deviation is $\sqrt{2/\pi} = 0.79788456\ldots$. Thus if X is a normally distributed random variable with expected value 0 then, see Geary (1935):
$$w=\frac{\operatorname{E}\left[|X|\right]}{\sqrt{\operatorname{E}\left[X^2\right]}} = \sqrt{\frac{2}{\pi}}\,.$$
In other words, for a normal distribution, mean absolute deviation is about 0.8 times the standard deviation. However, in-sample measurements deliver values of the ratio of mean average deviation / standard deviation for a given Gaussian sample n with the following bounds: $w_n \in [0,1]$, with a bias for small n.

The mean absolute deviation from the mean is less than or equal to the standard deviation; one way of proving this relies on Jensen's inequality.

Proof

Jensen's inequality is $\varphi\left(\operatorname{E}[Y]\right) \leq \operatorname{E}\left[\varphi(Y)\right]$, where $\varphi$ is a convex function, this implies for $Y = \vert X-\mu\vert$ that:
$$\left(\operatorname{E}\left[|X-\mu|\right]\right)^{2} \leq \operatorname{E}\left[|X-\mu|^2\right] = \operatorname{Var}(X)$$

Since both sides are positive, and the square root is a monotonically increasing function in the positive domain:
$$\operatorname{E}\left[|X-\mu|\right] \leq \sqrt{\operatorname{Var}(X)}$$

For a general case of this statement, see Hölder's inequality.

=== Mean absolute deviation around the median ===
The median is the point about which the mean deviation is minimized. The MAD median offers a direct measure of the scale of a random variable around its median
$$D_\text{med} = \operatorname{E}\left[|X-\text{median}|\right]$$

This is the maximum likelihood estimator of the scale parameter $b$ of the Laplace distribution.

Since the median minimizes the average absolute distance, we have $D_\text{med} \le D_\text{mean}$. The mean absolute deviation from the median is less than or equal to the mean absolute deviation from the mean. In fact, the mean absolute deviation from the median is always less than or equal to the mean absolute deviation from any other fixed number.

By using the general dispersion function, Habib (2011) defined MAD about median as
$$D_\text{med} = \operatorname{E}\left[|X-\text{median}|\right] = 2\operatorname{Cov}(X,I_O)$$
where the indicator function is
$$\mathbf{I}_O := \begin{cases}
1 &\text{if } x > \text{median}, \\
0 &\text{otherwise}.
\end{cases}$$

This representation allows for obtaining MAD median correlation coefficients.

== Median absolute deviation around a central point ==
While in principle the mean or any other central point could be taken as the central point for the median absolute deviation, most often the median value is taken instead.

=== Median absolute deviation around the median ===
The median absolute deviation (also MAD) is the median of the absolute deviation from the median. It is a robust estimator of dispersion.

For the example {2, 2, 3, 4, 14}: 3 is the median, so the absolute deviations from the median are {1, 1, 0, 1, 11} (reordered as {0, 1, 1, 1, 11}) with a median of 1, in this case unaffected by the value of the outlier 14, so the median absolute deviation is 1.

For a symmetric distribution, the median absolute deviation is equal to half the interquartile range.

== Maximum absolute deviation ==
The maximum absolute deviation around an arbitrary point is the maximum of the absolute deviations of a sample from that point. While not strictly a measure of central tendency, the maximum absolute deviation can be found using the formula for the average absolute deviation as above with $m(X)=\max(X)$, where $\max(X)$ is the sample maximum.

== Minimization ==
The measures of statistical dispersion derived from absolute deviation characterize various measures of central tendency as minimizing dispersion: The median is the measure of central tendency most associated with the absolute deviation. Some location parameters can be compared as follows:

- L^{2} norm statistics: the mean minimizes the mean squared error
- L^{1} norm statistics: the median minimizes average absolute deviation,
- L^{∞} norm statistics: the mid-range minimizes the maximum absolute deviation
- trimmed L^{∞} norm statistics: for example, the midhinge (average of first and third quartiles) which minimizes the median absolute deviation of the whole distribution, also minimizes the maximum absolute deviation of the distribution after the top and bottom 25% have been trimmed off.

== Estimation ==
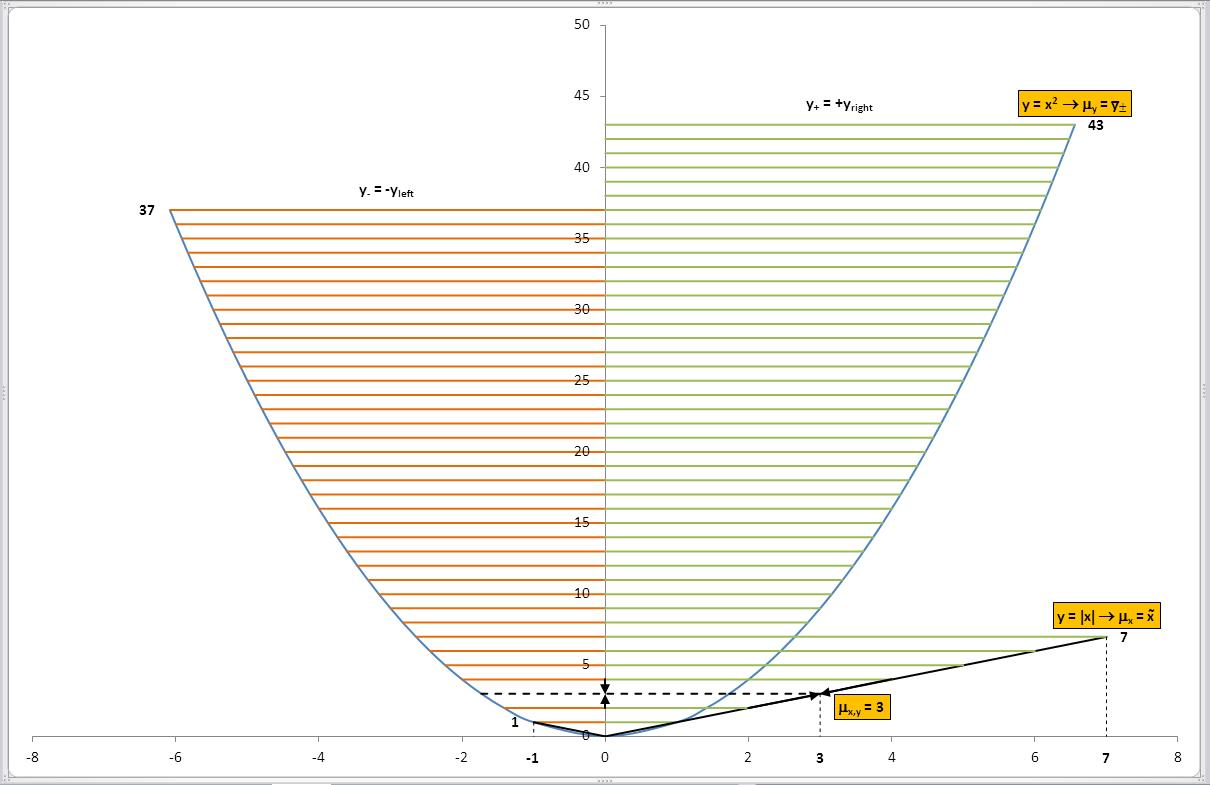

The mean absolute deviation of a sample is a biased estimator of the mean absolute deviation of the population. In order for the absolute deviation to be an unbiased estimator, the expected value (average) of all the sample absolute deviations must equal the population absolute deviation. However, it does not. For the population 1,2,3 both the population absolute deviation about the median and the population absolute deviation about the mean are 2/3. The average of all the sample absolute deviations about the mean of size 3 that can be drawn from the population is 44/81, while the average of all the sample absolute deviations about the median is 4/9. Therefore, the absolute deviation is a biased estimator.

However, this argument is based on the notion of mean-unbiasedness. Each measure of location has its own form of unbiasedness (see entry on biased estimator). The relevant form of unbiasedness here is median unbiasedness.

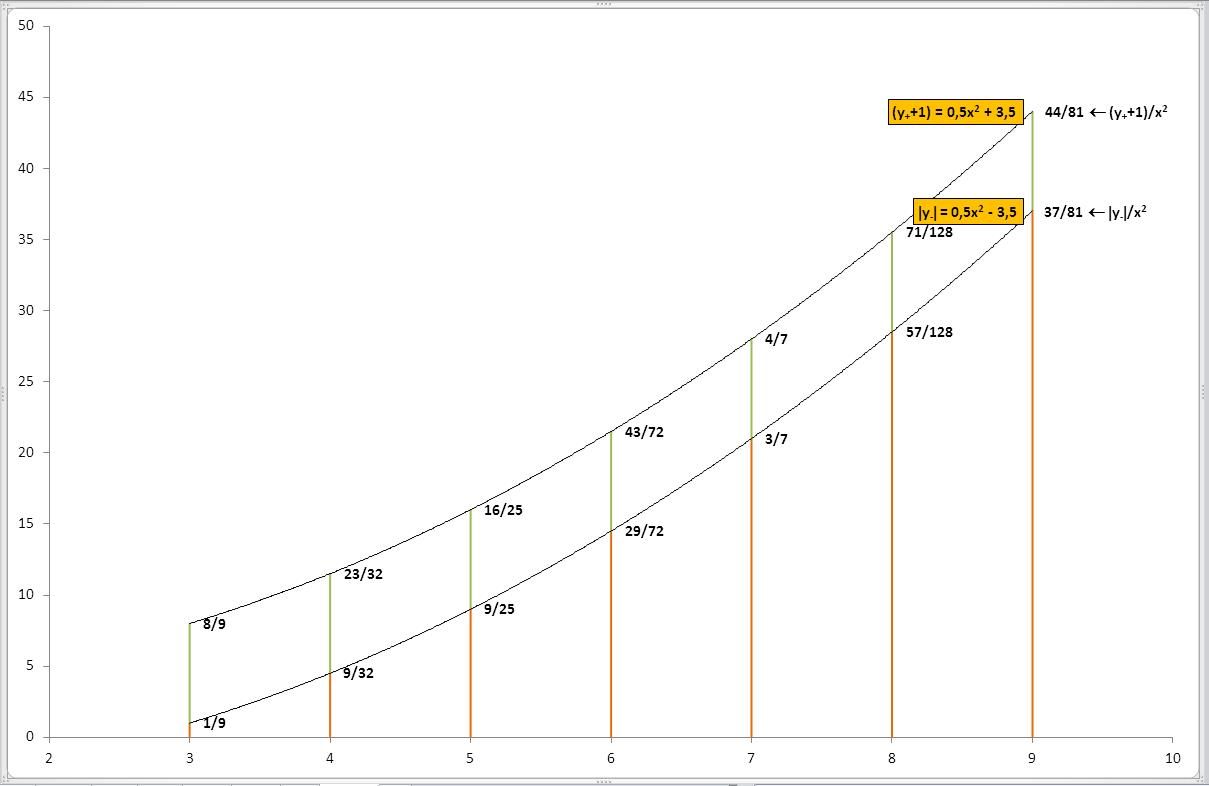

== See also ==
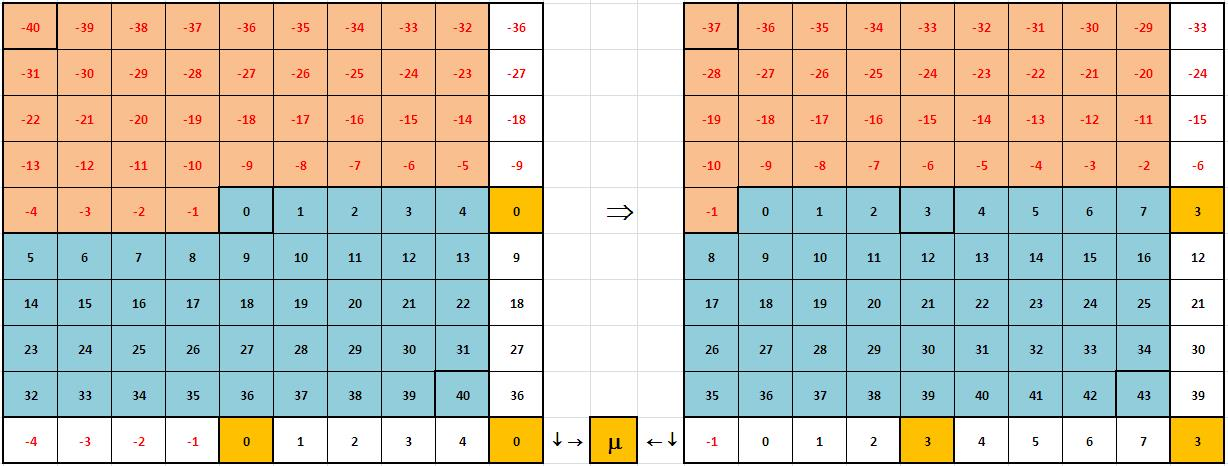

- Deviation (statistics)
  - Median absolute deviation
  - Squared deviations from the mean
  - Least absolute deviations
- Errors
  - Mean absolute error
  - Mean absolute percentage error
  - Probable error
- Mean absolute difference
- Average rectified value
