= Hampel test =

Type of statistical test

The Hampel test (also known as the Hampel identifier or the Hampel method) is a statistical technique that identifies outliers in datasets.

It works by selecting a window of neighbouring points around each point. The median and median absolute deviation (MAD) of these points is calculated, and it is checked whether the central point deviates from the median by more than a certain threshold (the threshold is determined in terms of the MAD). If the point is beyond the limit, it is considered an outlier and is replaced by the median of the selected window.

It is considered a robust model, as it relies on the usage of the median and the MAD, rather than the mean and the standard deviation, which makes it less sensitive to other existing outliers in a window of points. The Hampel filter is a screen used in signal processing that uses the Hampel identifier to replace outlier values with the window median.
