= Influence function =

In mathematics, influence function is used to mean either:

- a synonym for a Green's function;
- Influence function (statistics), the effect on an estimator of changing one point of the sample
