= Midhinge =

In statistics, the midhinge (MH) is the average of the first and third quartiles and is thus a measure of location. Equivalently, it is the 25% trimmed mid-range or 25% midsummary; it is an L-estimator. The midhinge MH is defined as
$$\begin{align}
\operatorname{MH}(X) &= \overline{Q_{1, 3}(X)} \\
&= \frac{Q_1(X) + Q_3(X)}{2} \\
&= \frac{P_{25}(X) + P_{75}(X)}{2} \\
&= M_{25}(X).
\end{align}$$

The midhinge is related to the interquartile range (IQR), the difference of the third and first quartiles (i.e. IQR = Q_{3} − Q_{1}), which is a measure of statistical dispersion. The two are complementary in sense that if one knows the midhinge and the IQR, one can find the first and third quartiles.

The use of the term hinge for the lower or upper quartiles derives from John Tukey's work on exploratory data analysis in the late 1970s, and midhinge is a fairly modern term dating from around that time. The midhinge is slightly simpler to calculate than the trimean (TM), which originated in the same context and equals the average of the median ( = Q_{2} = P_{50}) and the midhinge:
$$\begin{align}
\operatorname{MH}(X) &= 2 \operatorname{TM}(X) - \operatorname{med}(X) \\
&= 2\; \frac{Q_1 + 2Q_2 + Q_3}{4} - Q_2.
\end{align}$$

== See also ==
- Interquartile mean
- L-estimator
