= Median absolute deviation =

Statistical measure of variability

In statistics, the median absolute deviation (MAD), also referred to as the median absolute deviation from the median (MADFM), is a robust or outlier-resistant measure of the variability of a univariate sample of quantitative data. For a univariate data set X_{1}, X_{2}, ..., X_{n}, the MAD is defined as the median of the absolute deviations from the data's median, $\operatorname{MAD} = \operatorname{median}( |X_i - \tilde{X}|)$. It can also refer to the population parameter that is estimated by the MAD calculated from a sample.

== Example ==
Consider the data (1, 1, 2, 2, 4, 6, 9). It has a median value of 2. The absolute deviations about 2 are (1, 1, 0, 0, 2, 4, 7) which in turn have a median value of 1 (because the sorted absolute deviations are (0, 0, 1, 1, 2, 4, 7)). So the median absolute deviation for this data is 1.

== Uses ==
The median absolute deviation is a measure of statistical dispersion. Moreover, the MAD is a robust statistic, being more resilient to outliers in a data set than the standard deviation. In the standard deviation, the distances from the mean are squared, so large deviations are weighted more heavily, and thus outliers can heavily influence it. In the MAD, the deviations of a small number of outliers are irrelevant.

Because the MAD is a more robust estimator of scale than the sample variance or standard deviation, it works better with distributions without a mean or variance, such as the Cauchy distribution.

== Relation to standard deviation ==
The MAD may be used similarly to how one would use the deviation for the average. In order to use the MAD as a consistent estimator for the estimation of the standard deviation $\sigma$, one takes

$$\hat{\sigma} = k \cdot \operatorname{MAD},$$

where $k$ is a constant scale factor, which depends on the distribution.

For normally distributed data $k$ is taken to be

$$k = 1/\left(\Phi^{-1}(3/4)\right) \approx 1/0.67449 \approx 1.4826,$$

i.e., the reciprocal of the quantile function $\Phi^{-1}$ (also known as the inverse of the cumulative distribution function) for the standard normal distribution $Z = (X - \mu) / \sigma$.

=== Derivation ===
The argument 3/4 is such that $\pm \operatorname{MAD}$ covers 50% (between 0.25 and 0.75) of the standard normal cumulative distribution function, i.e.

$$\frac 12 = P(|X - \mu| \le \operatorname{MAD}) = P\left(\left|\frac{X - \mu}{\sigma}\right| \le \frac {\operatorname{MAD}} \sigma\right) = P\left(|Z| \le \frac{\operatorname{MAD}}{\sigma}\right).$$

Therefore, we must have that

$$\Phi\left(\operatorname{MAD} / \sigma\right) - \Phi\left(-\operatorname{MAD} / \sigma\right) = 1/2.$$

Noticing that

$$\Phi\left(-\operatorname{MAD} / \sigma\right) = 1 - \Phi\left(\operatorname{MAD} / \sigma\right),$$

we have that $\operatorname{MAD} / \sigma = \Phi^{-1}(3/4) = 0.67449$, from which we obtain the scale factor $k = 1 / \Phi^{-1}(3/4) = 1.4826$.

Another way of establishing the relationship is noting that MAD equals the half-normal distribution median:

$$\operatorname{MAD} = \sigma\sqrt{2}\operatorname{erf}^{-1}(1/2) \approx 0.67449 \sigma.$$

This form is used in, e.g., the probable error.

In the case of complex values (X+iY), the relation of MAD to the standard deviation is unchanged for normally distributed data.

== Multivariate generalization ==
Analogously to how the median generalizes to the geometric median (GM) in multivariate data, MAD can be generalized to the median of distances to GM (MADGM) in n dimensions. This is done by replacing the absolute differences in one dimension by Euclidean distances between the data points and the geometric median in n dimensions. This gives the identical result as the univariate MAD in one dimension and generalizes to any number of dimensions. MADGM needs the geometric median to be found, which is done by an iterative process.

== The population MAD ==
The population MAD is defined analogously to the sample MAD, but is based on the complete population rather than on a sample. For a symmetric distribution with zero mean, the population MAD is the 75th percentile of the distribution.

Unlike the variance, which may be infinite or undefined, the population MAD is always a finite number. For example, the standard Cauchy distribution has undefined variance, but its MAD is 1.

The earliest known mention of the concept of the MAD occurred in 1816, in a paper by Carl Friedrich Gauss on the determination of the accuracy of numerical observations.

== See also ==
- Deviation (statistics)
- Interquartile range
- Probable error
- Robust measures of scale
- Relative mean absolute difference
- Average absolute deviation
- Least absolute deviations
