= Scale parameter =

Statistical measure

In probability theory and statistics, a scale parameter is a special kind of numerical parameter of a parametric family of probability distributions. The larger the scale parameter, the more spread out the distribution.

== Definition ==
If a family of probability distributions is such that there is a parameter s (and other parameters θ) for which the cumulative distribution function satisfies

$$F(x;s,\theta) = F(x/s;1,\theta),$$

then s is called a scale parameter, since its value determines the "scale" or statistical dispersion of the probability distribution. If s is large, then the distribution will be more spread out; if s is small then it will be more concentrated.

Animation showing the effects of a scale parameter on a probability distribution supported on the positive real line.

Effect of a scale parameter over a mixture of two normal probability distributions

If the probability density exists for all values of the complete parameter set, then the density (as a function of the scale parameter only) satisfies
$$f_s(x) = f(x/s)/s,$$
where f is the density of a standardized version of the density, i.e. $f(x) \equiv f_{s=1}(x)$.

An estimator of a scale parameter is called an estimator of scale.

=== Families with Location Parameters ===
In the case where a parametrized family has a location parameter, a slightly different definition is often used as follows. If we denote the location parameter by $m$, and the scale parameter by $s$, then we require that $F(x;s,m,\theta)=F((x-m)/s;1,0,\theta)$ where $F(x,s,m,\theta)$ is the CDF for the parametrized family. This modification is necessary in order for the standard deviation of a non-central Gaussian to be a scale parameter, since otherwise the mean would change when we rescale $x$. However, this alternative definition is not consistently used.

=== Simple manipulations ===
We can write $f_s$ in terms of $g(x) = x/s$, as follows:

$$f_s(x) = f\left(\frac{x}{s}\right) \cdot \frac{1}{s} = f(g(x))g'(x).$$

Because f is a probability density function, it integrates to unity:

$$1 = \int_{-\infty}^{\infty} f(x)\,dx
= \int_{g(-\infty)}^{g(\infty)} f(x)\,dx.$$

By the substitution rule of integral calculus, we then have

$$1 = \int_{-\infty}^{\infty} f(g(x)) g'(x)\,dx
= \int_{-\infty}^{\infty} f_s(x)\,dx.$$

So $f_s$ is also properly normalized.

== Rate parameter ==
Some families of distributions use a rate parameter (or inverse scale parameter), which is simply the reciprocal of the scale parameter. So for example the exponential distribution with scale parameter β and probability density
$$f(x;\beta ) = \frac{1}{\beta} e^{-x/\beta} ,\; x \ge 0$$
could equivalently be written with rate parameter λ as
$$f(x;\lambda) = \lambda e^{-\lambda x} ,\; x \ge 0.$$

== Examples ==
- The uniform distribution can be parameterized with a location parameter of $(a+b)/2$ and a scale parameter $|b-a|$.
- The normal distribution has two parameters: a location parameter $\mu$ and a scale parameter $\sigma$. In practice the normal distribution is often parameterized in terms of the squared scale $\sigma^2$, which corresponds to the variance of the distribution.
- The gamma distribution is usually parameterized in terms of a scale parameter $\theta$ or its inverse.
- Special cases of distributions where the scale parameter equals unity may be called "standard" under certain conditions. For example, if the location parameter equals zero and the scale parameter equals one, the normal distribution is known as the standard normal distribution, and the Cauchy distribution as the standard Cauchy distribution.

== Estimation ==
A statistic can be used to estimate a scale parameter so long as it:

- Is location-invariant,
- Scales linearly with the scale parameter, and
- Converges as the sample size grows.

Various measures of statistical dispersion satisfy these. In order to make the statistic a consistent estimator for the scale parameter, one must in general multiply the statistic by a constant scale factor. This scale factor is defined as the theoretical value of the value obtained by dividing the required scale parameter by the asymptotic value of the statistic. Note that the scale factor depends on the distribution in question.

For instance, in order to use the median absolute deviation (MAD) to estimate the standard deviation of the normal distribution, one must multiply it by the factor
$$1/\Phi^{-1}(3/4) \approx 1.4826,$$
where Φ^{−1} is the quantile function (inverse of the cumulative distribution function) for the standard normal distribution. (See MAD for details.) That is, the MAD is not a consistent estimator for the standard deviation of a normal distribution, but 1.4826... × MAD is a consistent estimator. Similarly, the average absolute deviation needs to be multiplied by approximately 1.2533 to be a consistent estimator for standard deviation. Different factors would be required to estimate the standard deviation if the population did not follow a normal distribution.

== See also ==
- Central tendency
- Invariant estimator
- Location parameter
- Location-scale family
- Mean-preserving spread
- Scale mixture
- Shape parameter
- Statistical dispersion

== General references ==
- "1.3.6.4. Location and Scale Parameters". National Institute of Standards and Technology.
