= Shape resonance =

Type of electron quantum state

In quantum mechanics, a shape resonance is a metastable state in which an electron is trapped due to the shape of a potential barrier. Altunata describes a state as being a shape resonance if, "the internal state of the system remains unchanged upon disintegration of the quasi-bound level." A more general discussion of resonances and their taxonomies in molecular system can be found in the review article by Schulz; for the discovery of the Fano resonance line-shape and for the Majorana pioneering work in this field by Antonio Bianconi; and for a mathematical review by Combes et al.

== Quantum mechanics ==
In quantum mechanics, a shape resonance, in contrast to a Feshbach resonance, is a resonance which is not turned into a bound state if the coupling between some degrees of freedom and the degrees of freedom associated to the fragmentation (reaction coordinates) are set to zero. More simply, the shape resonance total energy is more than the separated fragment energy. Practical implications of this difference for lifetimes and spectral widths are mentioned in works such as Zobel.

Related terms include a special kind of shape resonance, the core-excited shape resonance, and trap-induced shape resonance.

Of course in one-dimensional systems, resonances are shape resonances. In a system with more than one degree of freedom, this definition makes sense only if the separable model, which supposes the two groups of degrees of freedom uncoupled, is a meaningful approximation. When the coupling becomes large, the situation is much less clear.

In the case of atomic and molecular electronic structure problems, it is well known that the self-consistent field (SCF) approximation is relevant at least as a starting point of more elaborate methods. The Slater determinants built from SCF orbitals (atomic or molecular orbitals) are shape resonances if only one electronic transition is required to emit one electron.

Today, there is some debate about the definition and even existence of the shape resonance in some systems observed with molecular spectroscopy. It has been experimentally observed in the anionic yields from photofragmentation of small molecules to provide details of internal structure.

In nuclear physics the concept of "Shape Resonance" is described by Amos de-Shalit and Herman Feshbach in their book.

"It is well known that the scattering from a potential shows characteristics peaks, as a function of energy, for such values of E that make the integral number of wave lengths sit within the potential. The resulting shape resonances are rather broad, their width being of the order of ...."

The shape resonances were observed around the years 1949–54 in nuclear scattering experiments. They indicate broad asymmetric peaks in the scattering cross section of neutrons or protons scattered by nuclei. The name "shape resonance" has been introduced to describe the fact that the resonance in the potential scattering for the particle of energy E is controlled by the shape of the nucleus. In fact the shape resonance occurs where the integral number of wavelengths of the particle sit within the potential of the nucleus of radius R. Therefore, the measure of the energies of the shape resonances in the neutron-nucleus scattering have been used in the years from 1947 to 1954 to measure the radii R of the nuclei with the precision of ±1×10^{−13} cm as it can be seen in the chapter "Elastic Cross Sections" of A Textbook in Nuclear Physics by R. D. Evans.

The "shape resonances" are discussed in general introductory academic courses of quantum mechanics in the frame of potential scattering phenomena.

The shape resonances arise from the quantum interference between closed and an open scattering channels. At the resonance energy a quasi bound state is degenerate with a continuum. This quantum interference in many body system has been described using quantum mechanics by Gregor Wentzel, for the interpretation of the Auger effect, by Ettore Majorana for the dissociation processes and quasi bound states, by Ugo Fano for the atomic auto-ionization states in the continuum of helium atomic spectrum and by Victor Frederick Weisskopf. J. M. Blatt and Herman Feshbach for nuclear scattering experiments.

The shape resonances are related with the existence of nearly stable bound states (that is, resonances) of two objects that dramatically influences how those two objects interact when their total energy is near that of the bound state. When the total energy of the objects is close to the energy of the resonance they interact strongly, and their scattering cross-section becomes very large.

A particular type of "shape resonance" occurs in multiband or two-band superconducting heterostructures at atomic limit called superstripes due to quantum interference of a first pairing channel in a first wide band and a second pairing channel in a second band where the chemical potential is tuned near a Lifshitz transition at the band edge or at the topological electronic transitions of the Fermi surface type "neck-collapsing" or "neck-disrupting"

== See also ==
- Resonance (particle physics)
- Feshbach–Fano partitioning
