= Virtual state =

A short-lived, unobservable quantum state

Energy-level diagram showing the states involved in Raman spectra, including virtual energy states.

In quantum physics, a virtual state is a very short-lived, unobservable quantum state.

In many quantum processes a virtual state is an intermediate state, sometimes described as "imaginary" in a multi-step process that mediates otherwise forbidden transitions. Since virtual states are not eigenfunctions of any operator, normal parameters such as occupation, energy and lifetime need to be qualified. No measurement of a system will show one to be occupied, but they still have lifetimes derived from uncertainty relations. While each virtual state has an associated energy, no direct measurement of its energy is possible but various approaches have been used to make some measurements (for example see and related work on virtual state spectroscopy) or extract other parameters using measurement techniques that depend upon the virtual state's lifetime. The concept is quite general and can be used to predict and describe experimental results in many areas including Raman spectroscopy, non-linear optics generally, various types of photochemistry, and nuclear processes.

== See also ==
- Two-photon absorption
- Virtual particle
- Feshbach resonance
- Shape resonance
