= Coupled mode theory =

Physics theory

Coupled mode theory (CMT) is a perturbational approach for analyzing the coupling of oscillatory systems (mechanical, optical, electrical, etc.) in space or in time. Coupled mode theory allows a wide range of devices and systems to be modeled as one or more coupled resonators. In optics, such systems include laser cavities, photonic crystal slabs, metamaterials, and ring resonators.

== History ==
Coupled mode theory first arose in the 1950s in the works of Miller on microwave transmission lines, Pierce on electron beams, and Gould on backward wave oscillators. This put in place the mathematical foundations for the modern formulation expressed by H. A. Haus et al. for optical waveguides.

In the late 1990s and early 2000s, the field of nanophotonics has revitalized interest in coupled mode theory. Coupled mode theory has been used to account for the Fano resonances in photonic crystal slabs and has also been modified to account for optical resonators with non-orthogonal modes. Since late 2000s, researchers have capitalized on coupled mode theory to explain the concept of magnetically coupled resonators.

== Overview ==
The oscillatory systems to which coupled mode theory applies are described by second order partial differential equations. CMT allows the second order partial differential equation to be expressed as one or more coupled first order ordinary differential equations. The following assumptions are generally made with CMT:

- Linearity
- Time-reversal symmetry
- Time-invariance
- Weak mode coupling (small perturbation of uncoupled modes)
- Energy conservation

== Formulation ==
The formulation of the coupled mode theory is based on the development of the solution to an electromagnetic problem into modes. Typically, the eigenmodes are used to form a complete basis. The choice of the basis and the adoption of certain hypothesis like parabolic approximation differs from formulation to formulation. The classification proposed by of the different formulation is as follows:

1. The choice of starting differential equation. some of the coupled mode theories are derived directly from the Maxwell differential equations although others use simplifications in order to obtain a Helmholtz equation.
2. The choice of principle to derive the equations of the CMT. Either the reciprocity theorem or the variational principle have been used.
3. The choice of orthogonality product used to establish the eigenmode base. Some references use the unconjugated form and others the complex-conjugated form.
4. Finally, the choice of the form of the equation, either vectorial or scalar.

When n modes of an electromagnetic wave propagate through a media in the direction z without loss, the power transported by each mode is described by a modal power Pm. At a given frequency ω.

$$P^\omega(z) = \sum_m^n P^\omega_m(z) = \frac 1 4 \sum_m^n N^\omega_m \left| a^\omega_m(z) \right|^2 \,\!$$

where N_{m} is the norm of the mth mode and a_{m} is the modal amplitude.

== See also ==
- Eigenmode expansion
