= Negative methane =

Negative ion of methane

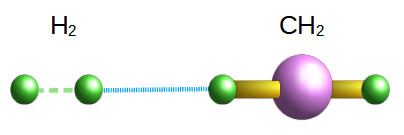
The stable state of negative methane. After capturing an extra electron, the methane anion evolves over time to a final stable state: a linear exciplex (H_{2}:CH_{2})^{−}.

Negative methane is the negative ion of methane, meaning that a neutral methane molecule captured an extra electron and became an ion with a total negative electric charge: CH^{−}_{4}. This kind of ion is also known as anion and are relevant in nature because negative ions have been observed to have important roles in several environments. For instance, they are confirmed in plasma, in the atmosphere of Earth and, in the ionosphere of Titan. Negative ions also hold the key for the radiocarbon dating method

Negative ions can not be described with conventional atomic theory. Quantum mechanical models, including more factors than solely Coulomb attraction, have to be considered to explain their stability. Such factors are Coulomb potential screening and electron correlation.

== Relevance ==
Negative methane is important for fundamental science because methane was not expected to produce a stable negative state. It is also relevant because the existence of its negative ion demonstrates an extra property of this powerful greenhouse gas. It is also relevant for plasma science, specially for methane-based plasma. In addition, it may be important in some atmospheric environments, where there exists methane, like in the ionosphere of satellite Titan where negative ion species have been detected.

Negative ions are metastable because they decay over time, releasing the extra electron. Therefore, they can act as time-dependent-sources of thermal electrons (low energy) in plasma environments. The presence of negative ions in the interstellar medium requires an efficient formation mechanism, because they are expected to have a short lifetime before being destroyed by H^{+} or other positive ions. In addition, their extra electron is in general weakly attached to its neutral core and as a consequence, it is also expected to lose the additional electron with a large probability, prompting again the question of the mechanism of its formation.

== History ==
Negative methane was not identified for at least two reasons. In mass spectrometers, its characteristic mark at m/q = −16 is similar to that of the well known anion of oxygen O^{−}. Because, oxygen is present in most mass spectrometers as a very habitual contaminant from the atmosphere, detections of any signal at this particular mark of m/q = −16 were readily attributed to the anion of oxygen and not to methane's.

Second, in chemistry, methane is the molecular isoelectronic analogous to neon gas. Since neon does not have a known stable negative ion state, methane was not expected to support an extra electron either.

However, its molecular nature allows more degrees of freedom that allow for the formation of a negative ion. By a change of its nuclear configuration to form a Feshback negative ion resonance in which the electrons or nuclei of the molecule can re-arrange to form an excited state capable of supporting the extra electron.

== Detection and structure ==
The existence of a stable state of negative methane was first reported in 2014. In this report, some of its properties were measured, like its very large average radius (3.5 Å), its long lifetime, and the electron detachment cross-section when interacting with molecules N_{2} and O_{2}.

The findings of that report (an experiment) are consistent with a quantum chemistry model in which it was found that its stable configuration corresponds to a linear molecular exciplex (CH_{2}:H_{2})^{−} which showed stability in the timescale of hundreds of picoseconds. However, the experiment of 2014 demonstrated stability over the larger timescale of microseconds, and therefore, perfectly fitted to be detected by standard mass spectrometry techniques.

The mechanism of formation of CH^{−}_{4} is not fully understood. However, it can be elucidated that it may form under high methane density conditions and, probably, a three-body collision.

== Electron Affinity of Methane ==
The electron affinity (E_{ea}) of an atom or molecule (A) is the energy difference between the ground state energy of the corresponding neutral species (E_{A}) and the ground state energy of the negative ion (E_{A^{−}}):

$$E_\text{ea} = E_\text{A} - E_{\text{A}^-}$$

In the case of CH^{−}_{4}, dissociation into CH^{−}_{2} and H_{2} is more likely than releasing the extra electron, therefore, the conventional definition of E_{ea} does not apply to methane. The energy difference between CH^{−}_{4} and CH^{−}_{2} + H_{2}, is 0.85 kcal/mol according to the available theoretical model.
