= Semiconductor ring laser =

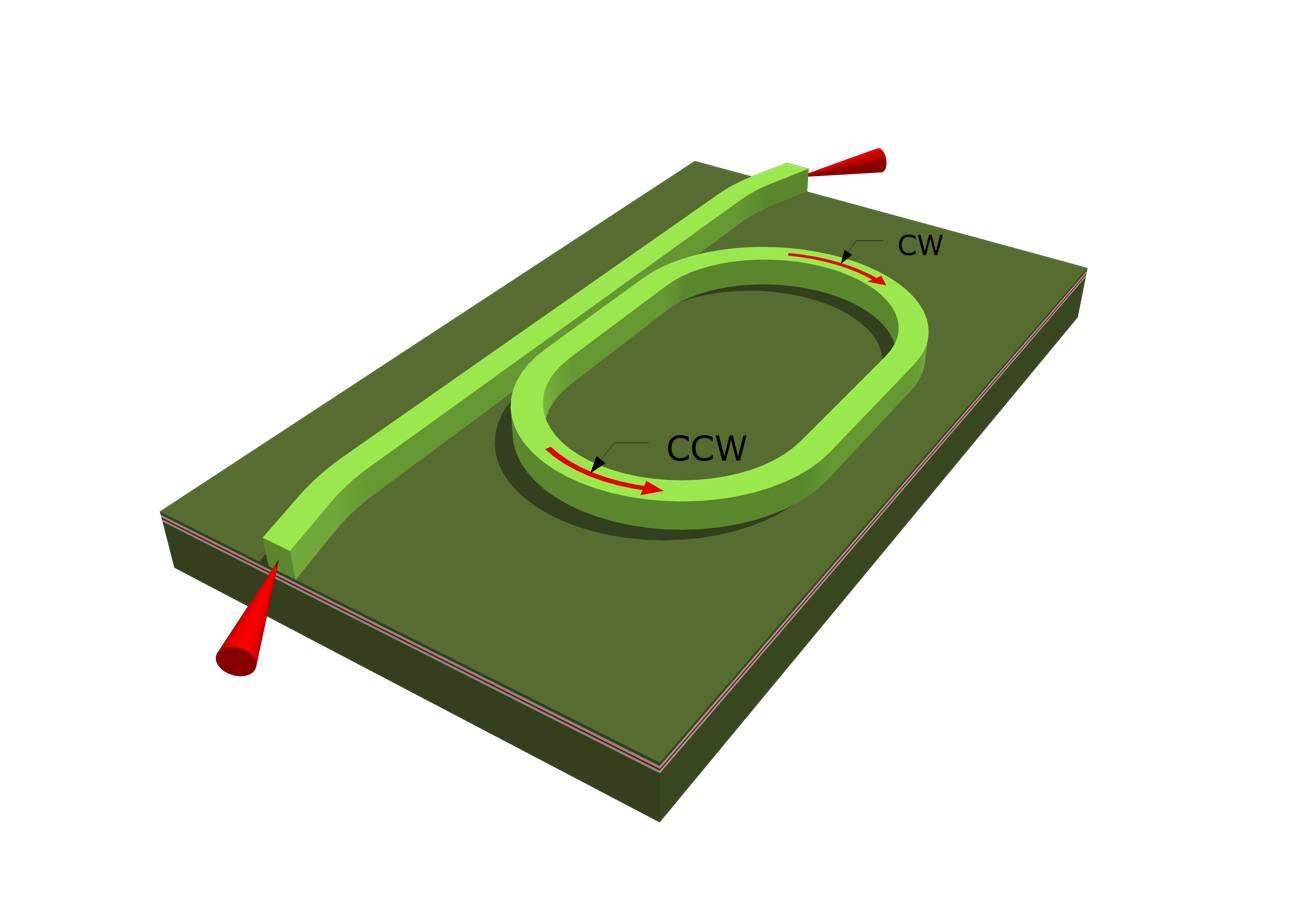
Illustration of a Semiconductor Ring Laser (SRL). The laser cavity is a waveguide with a racetrack geometry (but this can also be another geometry), which enables it to lase in two counterpropagating directions: clockwise (CW) and counterclockwise (CCW). The light is evanescently coupled out of the cavity to a straight output waveguide.

Semiconductor ring lasers (SRLs) are miniature ring laser devices with potential applications in optoelectronics, photonics and all-optical circuits. The first SRLs were developed in the 1980s. Recently, they have been of interest as potential random-access memory storage devices for all-optical computers.

Semiconductor ring lasers are literally ring-shaped optical waveguides with a lasing medium. They have the ability to trap light in a ring, and recirculate it continuously as long as they remain powered. The material of choice for SRLs is indium phosphide. SRLs can be square with corner reflectors, or, as is more common with the smaller designs, have a curved, "racetrack" shape. Devices are currently on the order of a 100 micrometres, but further miniaturization should be possible using existing silicon microelectronics technology.

In the summer of 2010 researchers Dr. Muhammad Maqbool and Kyle Main of Ball State University and Dr. Martin Kordesch of Ohio University were able to successfully develop the first Aluminum Nitride SRL on the order of 20 micrometers in diameter. This SRL was constructed by depositing a 4 micrometer thick semi conducting Aluminum-Nitride film doped with Ti+3 ions onto a stretched fiber optic cable of 12 micrometer diameter. This SRL was shown to have considerable gain and a low threshold pump power, making it a highly efficient laser system. The light was confined only to the film and did not reflect off of the outer surface of the optical fiber. Such an arrangement is called a "Whispering Gallery Mode". Maqbool and Main plan to expand their work to include the development of nano scale SRLs on carbon nanotubes.

SRLs may serve as the basis of a new form of optical random access memory. The direction of circulation of light (clockwise or counterclockwise) would indicate the polarity of the bit (0 or 1). Due in part to the bistable and highly non-linear nature of the devices, they can be fed a starting signal from either direction. The directionality is maintained as long as the device remains powered. Other potential applications include "a digital response device that reshapes optical signals that have become distorted, effectively acting as a gate." and a device for resynchronizing optical signals to eliminate timing "jitter".

A European research project formed in 2006 to study potential applications of SRLs. It is known as IOLOS, (Integrated optical logic and memory using ultra-fast micro-ring bistable semiconductor laser), and will receive funding of €1.25 million over three years. Intense Photonics and Siemens are also providing a further €100,000.

== See also ==
- Ring laser
- Optical ring resonators
- Ring laser gyroscope
