= Coefficient of variation =

Relative measure of dispersion expressed as the ratio of standard deviation to the mean

In probability theory and statistics, the coefficient of variation (CV), also known as normalized root-mean-square deviation (NRMSD), and relative standard deviation (RSD), is a standardized measure of dispersion of a probability distribution or frequency distribution. It is defined as the ratio of the standard deviation $\sigma$ to the mean $\mu$ (or its absolute value, $| \mu |$), and often expressed as a percentage ("%RSD").

The CV or RSD is widely used in analytical chemistry to express the precision and repeatability of an assay. It is also commonly used in fields such as engineering or physics when doing quality assurance studies and ANOVA gauge R&R, by economists and investors in economic models, in epidemiology, and in psychology/neuroscience.

== Definition ==
The coefficient of variation (CV) is defined as the ratio of the standard deviation $\sigma$ to the mean $\mu$,

$$CV = \frac{\sigma}{\mu}.$$

It shows the extent of variability in relation to the mean of the population. The coefficient of variation should be computed only for data measured on scales that have a meaningful zero (ratio scale) and hence allow relative comparison of two measurements (i.e., division of one measurement by the other). The coefficient of variation may not have any meaning for data on an interval scale. For example, most temperature scales (e.g., Celsius, Fahrenheit etc.) are interval scales with arbitrary zeros, so the computed coefficient of variation would be different depending on the scale used. On the other hand, Kelvin temperature has a meaningful zero, the complete absence of thermal energy, and thus is a ratio scale. In plain language, it is meaningful to say that 20 Kelvin is twice as hot as 10 Kelvin, but only in this scale with a true absolute zero. While a standard deviation (SD) can be measured in Kelvin, Celsius, or Fahrenheit, the value computed is only applicable to that scale. Only the Kelvin scale can be used to compute a valid coefficient of variation.

Measurements that are log-normally distributed exhibit stationary CV; in contrast, SD varies depending upon the expected value of measurements.

A more robust possibility is the quartile coefficient of dispersion, half the interquartile range ${(Q_3 - Q_1)/2}$ divided by the average of the quartiles (the midhinge), ${(Q_1 + Q_3)/2}$.

In most cases, a CV is computed for a single independent variable (e.g., a single factory product) with numerous, repeated measures of a dependent variable (e.g., error in the production process). However, data that are linear or even logarithmically non-linear and include a continuous range for the independent variable with sparse measurements across each value (e.g., scatter-plot) may be amenable to single CV calculation using a maximum-likelihood estimation approach.

== Examples ==
In the examples below, we will take the values given as randomly chosen from a larger population of values.

- The data set [100, 100, 100] has constant values. Its standard deviation is 0 and average is 100, giving the coefficient of variation as 0 / 100 = 0
- The data set [90, 100, 110] has more variability. Its standard deviation is 10 and its average is 100, giving the coefficient of variation as 10 / 100 = 0.1
- The data set [1, 5, 6, 8, 10, 40, 65, 88] has still more variability. Its standard deviation is 32.9 and its average is 27.9, giving a coefficient of variation of 32.9 / 27.9 = 1.18

In these examples, we will take the values given as the entire population of values.

- The data set [100, 100, 100] has a population standard deviation of 0 and a coefficient of variation of 0 / 100 = 0
- The data set [90, 100, 110] has a population standard deviation of 8.16 and a coefficient of variation of 8.16 / 100 = 0.0816
- The data set [1, 5, 6, 8, 10, 40, 65, 88] has a population standard deviation of 30.8 and a coefficient of variation of 30.8 / 27.9 = 1.10

== Estimation ==
When only a sample of data from a population is available, the population CV can be estimated using the ratio of the sample standard deviation $s \,$ to the sample mean $\bar{x}$:

$$\widehat{c_{\rm v}} = \frac{s}{\bar{x}}$$

But this estimator, when applied to a small or moderately sized sample, tends to be too low: it is a biased estimator. For normally distributed data, an unbiased estimator for a sample of size n is:

$$\widehat{c_{\rm v}}^*=\bigg(1+\frac{1}{4n}\bigg)\widehat{c_{\rm v}}$$

=== Log-normal data ===
Many datasets follow an approximately log-normal distribution. In such cases, a more accurate estimate, derived from the properties of the log-normal distribution, is defined as:

$$\widehat{cv}_{\rm raw} = \sqrt{\mathrm{e}^{s_{\ln}^2}-1}$$

where ${s_{\ln}} \,$ is the sample standard deviation of the data after a natural log transformation. (In the event that measurements are recorded using any other logarithmic base, b, their standard deviation $s_b \,$ is converted to base e using $s_{\ln} = s_b \ln(b) \,$, and the formula for $\widehat{cv}_{\rm raw} \,$ remains the same.) This estimate is sometimes referred to as the "geometric CV" (GCV) in order to distinguish it from the simple estimate above. However, "geometric coefficient of variation" has also been defined by Kirkwood as:

$$\mathrm{GCV_K} = {\mathrm{e}^{s_{\ln}}\!\!-1}$$

This term was intended to be analogous to the coefficient of variation, for describing multiplicative variation in log-normal data, but this definition of GCV has no theoretical basis as an estimate of $c_{\rm v} \,$ itself.

For many practical purposes (such as sample size determination and calculation of confidence intervals) it is $s_{ln} \,$ which is of most use in the context of log-normally distributed data. If necessary, this can be derived from an estimate of $c_{\rm v} \,$ or GCV by inverting the corresponding formula.

== Comparison to standard deviation ==
=== Advantages ===
The coefficient of variation is useful because the standard deviation of data must always be understood in the context of the mean of the data. In contrast, the actual value of the CV is independent of the unit in which the measurement has been taken, so it is a dimensionless number. For comparison between data sets with different units or widely different means, one should use the coefficient of variation instead of the standard deviation.

=== Disadvantages ===
- When the mean value is close to zero, the coefficient of variation will approach infinity and is therefore sensitive to small changes in the mean. This is often the case if the values do not originate from a ratio scale.
- Unlike the standard deviation, it cannot be used directly to construct confidence intervals for the mean.

== Applications ==
The coefficient of variation is also common in applied probability fields such as renewal theory, queueing theory, and reliability theory. In these fields, the exponential distribution is often more important than the normal distribution. The standard deviation of an exponential distribution is equal to its mean, so its coefficient of variation is equal to 1. Distributions with CV < 1 (such as an Erlang distribution) are considered low-variance, while those with CV > 1 (such as a hyper-exponential distribution) are considered high-variance. Some formulas in these fields are expressed using the squared coefficient of variation, often abbreviated SCV. In modeling, a variation of the CV is the CV(RMSD). Essentially the CV(RMSD) replaces the standard deviation term with the Root Mean Square Deviation (RMSD). While many natural processes indeed show a correlation between the average value and the amount of variation around it, accurate sensor devices need to be designed in such a way that the coefficient of variation is close to zero, i.e., yielding a constant absolute error over their working range.

In actuarial science, the CV is known as unitized risk.

In industrial solids processing, CV is particularly important to measure the degree of homogeneity of a powder mixture. Comparing the calculated CV to a specification will allow to define if a sufficient degree of mixing has been reached.

=== Laboratory measures of intra-assay and inter-assay CVs ===
CV measures are often used as quality controls for quantitative laboratory assays. While intra-assay and inter-assay CVs might be assumed to be calculated by simply averaging CV values across CV values for multiple samples within one assay or by averaging multiple inter-assay CV estimates, it has been suggested that these practices are incorrect and that a more complex computational process is required. It has also been noted that CV values are not an ideal index of the certainty of a measurement when the number of replicates varies across samples − in this case standard error in percent is suggested to be superior. If measurements do not have a natural zero point then the CV is not a valid measurement and alternative measures such as the intraclass correlation coefficient are recommended.

=== As a measure of economic inequality ===
The coefficient of variation fulfills the requirements for a measure of economic inequality. If x (with entries x_{i}) is a list of the values of an economic indicator (e.g. wealth), with x_{i} being the wealth of agent i, then the following requirements are met:

- Anonymity – c_{v} is independent of the ordering of the list x. This follows from the fact that the variance and mean are independent of the ordering of x.
- Scale invariance: c_{v}(x) = c_{v}(αx) where α is a real number.
- Population independence – If {x,x} is the list x appended to itself, then c_{v}({x,x}) = c_{v}(x). This follows from the fact that the variance and mean both obey this principle.
- Pigou–Dalton transfer principle: when wealth is transferred from a wealthier agent i to a poorer agent j (i.e. x_{i} > x_{j}) without altering their rank, then c_{v} decreases and vice versa.

c_{v} assumes its minimum value of zero for complete equality (all x_{i} are equal). Its most notable drawback is that it is not bounded from above, so it cannot be normalized to be within a fixed range (e.g. like the Gini coefficient which is constrained to be between 0 and 1). It is, however, more mathematically tractable than the Gini coefficient.

=== As a measure of standardisation of archaeological artefacts ===
Archaeologists often use CV values to compare the degree of standardisation of ancient artefacts. Variation in CVs has been interpreted to indicate different cultural transmission contexts for the adoption of new technologies. Coefficients of variation have also been used to investigate pottery standardisation relating to changes in social organisation. Archaeologists also use several methods for comparing CV values, for example the modified signed-likelihood ratio (MSLR) test for equality of CVs.

== Examples of misuse ==
Comparing coefficients of variation between parameters using relative units can result in differences that may not be real. If we compare the same set of temperatures in Celsius and Fahrenheit (both relative units, where kelvin and Rankine scale are their associated absolute values):

Celsius: [0, 10, 20, 30, 40]

Fahrenheit: [32, 50, 68, 86, 104]

The sample standard deviations are 15.81 and 28.46, respectively. The CV of the first set is 15.81/20 = 79%. For the second set (which are the same temperatures) it is 28.46/68 = 42%.

If, for example, the data sets are temperature readings from two different sensors (a Celsius sensor and a Fahrenheit sensor) and you want to know which sensor is better by picking the one with the least variance, then you will be misled if you use CV. The problem here is that you have divided by a relative value rather than an absolute.

Comparing the same data set, now in absolute units:

Kelvin: [273.15, 283.15, 293.15, 303.15, 313.15]

Rankine: [491.67, 509.67, 527.67, 545.67, 563.67]

The sample standard deviations are still 15.81 and 28.46, respectively, because the standard deviation is not affected by a constant offset. The coefficients of variation, however, are now both equal to 5.39%.

Mathematically speaking, the coefficient of variation is not entirely linear. That is, for a random variable $X$, the coefficient of variation of $aX+b$ is equal to the coefficient of variation of $X$ only when $b = 0$. In the above example, Celsius can only be converted to Fahrenheit through a linear transformation of the form $ax+b$ with $b \neq 0$, whereas Kelvins can be converted to Rankines through a transformation of the form $ax$.

== Distribution ==
Provided that negative and small positive values of the sample mean occur with negligible frequency, the probability distribution of the coefficient of variation for a sample of size $n$ of i.i.d. normal random variables has been shown by Hendricks and Robey to be

$$\mathrm{d}F_{c_{\rm v}} = \frac{2}{\pi^{1/2} \Gamma {\left(\frac{n-1}{2}\right)}} \exp \left( -\frac{n}{2\left(\frac{\sigma}{\mu}\right)^2} \cdot \frac{{c_{\rm v}}^2}{1+{c_{\rm v}}^2} \right) \frac{{c_{\rm v}}^{n-2}}{(1+{c_{\rm v}}^2)^{n/2}}\sideset{}{^\prime}\sum_{i=0}^{n-1}\frac{(n-1)! \, \Gamma \left(\frac{n-i}{2}\right)}{(n-1-i)! \, i! \,} \cdot \frac{n^{i/2}}{2^{i/2} \cdot \left(\frac{\sigma}{\mu}\right)^i} \cdot \frac{1}{(1+{c_{\rm v}}^2)^{i/2}} \, \mathrm{d}c_{\rm v} ,$$

where the symbol $\sideset{}{^\prime}\sum$ indicates that the summation is over only even values of $n - 1 - i$, i.e., if $n$ is odd, sum over even values of $i$ and if $n$ is even, sum only over odd values of $i$.

This is useful, for instance, in the construction of hypothesis tests or confidence intervals. Statistical inference for the coefficient of variation in normally distributed data is often based on McKay's chi-square approximation for the coefficient of variation.

=== Alternative ===
Liu (2012) reviews methods for the construction of a confidence interval for the coefficient of variation. Notably, Lehmann (1986) derived the sampling distribution for the coefficient of variation using a non-central t-distribution to give an exact method for the construction of the CI.

== Similar ratios ==
Standardized moments are similar ratios, ${\mu_k}/{\sigma^k}$ where $\mu_k$ is the k^{th} moment about the mean, which are also dimensionless and scale invariant. The variance-to-mean ratio, $\sigma^2/\mu$, is another similar ratio, but is not dimensionless, and hence not scale invariant. See Normalization (statistics) for further ratios.

In signal processing, particularly image processing, the reciprocal ratio $\mu/\sigma$ (or its square) is referred to as the signal-to-noise ratio in general and signal-to-noise ratio (imaging) in particular.

Other related ratios include:

- Efficiency, $\sigma^2 / \mu^2$
- Standardized moment, $\mu_k/\sigma^k$
- Variance-to-mean ratio (or relative variance), $\sigma^2/\mu$
- Fano factor, $\sigma^2_W/\mu_W$ (windowed VMR)
- Second-order coefficient of variation $V_2 = \sqrt{\frac{\sigma^2}{\sigma^2 + \mu^2}}$ which is bounded between 0 (no variance) and 1 (maximal relative variance, i.e. $\sigma \gg \mu$).
- Gini coefficient, $\frac{1}{2\mu N^2} \sum_{i=1}^N \sum_{j=1}^N |x_i - x_j|$, which can be mathematically understood as the absolute-difference counterpart to the coefficient of variation. While the coefficient of variation relies on squared pairwise differences (making it highly sensitive to extreme outliers), the Gini coefficient relies on absolute pairwise differences, making it a more stable measure of relative spread for heavy-tailed distributions like wealth.

== See also ==
- Standard score
- Information ratio
- Omega ratio
- Sampling (statistics)
- Variance function
- Gini coefficient
