= Resonance (particle physics) =

Concept in scattering theory

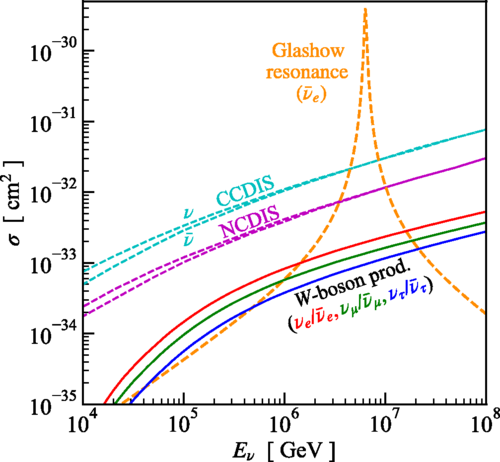
Cross sections between neutrinos and ^{16}O for W-boson production, compared to those for charged-current (CC) and neutral current (NC) deep inelastic scattering (DIS), and the predicted Glashow resonance.

In particle physics, a resonance is the peak located around a certain energy found in differential cross sections of scattering experiments. These peaks are associated with subatomic particles, which include a variety of bosons, quarks and hadrons (such as nucleons, delta baryons or upsilon mesons) and their excitations. Resonances can be explained as excited states of the reacting particles, or as virtual particles in intermediate steps of the reaction with very short lifetimes (10^{−23} seconds or less).

The width of the resonance (Γ) is related to the mean lifetime (τ) of the particle or excited state by the relation

$$\Gamma=\frac{\hbar}{\tau}$$

where ${\hbar}=\frac{h}{2\pi}$ and h is the Planck constant.

Thus, the lifetime of the resonance is the direct inverse of the resonance's width. For example, the charged pion has the second-longest lifetime of any meson, at 2.6033×10^{−8} s. Therefore, its resonance width is very small, about 2.528×10^{−8} eV or about 6.11 MHz. Pions are generally not considered as "resonances". The charged rho meson has a very short lifetime, about 4.41×10^{−24} s. Correspondingly, its resonance width is very large, at 149.1 MeV or about 36 ZHz. This amounts to nearly one-fifth of the particle's rest mass.

== See also ==
- Baryon resonance particles
- Roper resonance
- Giant resonance
- Feshbach resonance
- Fano resonance
- Feshbach–Fano partitioning
- Resonances in scattering from potentials
- Levinson's theorem
- Relativistic Breit–Wigner distribution
