= Resonances in scattering from potentials =

In quantum mechanics, resonance cross section occurs in the context of quantum scattering theory, which deals with studying the scattering of quantum particles from potentials. The scattering problem deals with the calculation of flux distribution of scattered particles/waves as a function of the potential, and of the state (characterized by conservation of momentum/energy) of the incident particle. For a free quantum particle incident on the potential, the plane wave solution to the time-independent Schrödinger wave equation is:

$$\psi(\vec{r}) = e^{i(\vec{k}\cdot\vec{r})}$$

For one-dimensional problems, the transmission coefficient $T$ is of interest. It is defined as:

$$T = \frac{|\vec J_\mathrm{trans}|}{|\vec J_\mathrm{inc}|}$$

where $\vec J$ is the probability current density. This gives the fraction of incident beam of particles that makes it through the potential. For three-dimensional problems, one would calculate the scattering cross-section $\sigma$, which, roughly speaking, is the total area of the incident beam which is scattered. Another quantity of relevance is the partial cross-section, $\sigma_\text{l}$, which denotes the scattering cross section for a partial wave of a definite angular momentum eigenstate. These quantities naturally depend on $\vec k$, the wave-vector of the incident wave, which is related to its energy by:

$$E=\frac{\hbar^2 |\vec{k}|^2}{2m}$$

The values of these quantities of interest, the transmission coefficient $T$ (in case of one dimensional potentials), and the partial cross-section $\sigma_\text{l}$ show peaks in their variation with the incident energy $E$. These phenomena are called resonances.

== One-dimensional case ==
=== Mathematical description ===
A one-dimensional finite square potential is given by

$$V(x) =
\begin{cases}
V_0, & 0 < x < L,\\
0, & \text{otherwise,}
\end{cases},$$

The sign of $V_0$ determines whether the square potential is a well or a barrier. To study the phenomena of resonance, the time-independent Schrödinger equation for a stationary state of a massive particle with energy $E>V_0$ is solved:

$$-\frac{\hbar^2}{2 m} \frac{d^2 \psi}{d x^2} + V(x) \psi = E \psi$$

The wave function solutions for the three regions $x<0,0<x<L, x>L$ are

$$\psi_1(x)=
\begin{cases}
A_1 e^{ik_1 x} + B_1 e^{-ik_1 x}, & x<0, \\
A_2 e^{ik_2 x} + B_2 e^{-ik_2 x}, & 0<x<L, \\
A_3 e^{ik_1 x} + B_3 e^{-ik_1 x}, & x>L,
\end{cases}$$

Here, $k_1$ and $k_2$ are the wave numbers in the potential-free region and within the potential respectively:

$$k_1= \frac{\sqrt{2mE}}{\hbar},$$
$$k_2 = \frac{\sqrt{2m(E-V_0)}}{\hbar},$$

To calculate $T$, a coefficient in the wave function is set as $B_3=0$, which corresponds to the fact that there is no wave incident on the potential from the right. Imposing the condition that the wave function $\psi(x)$ and its derivative $\frac{d\psi}{dx}$ should be continuous at the well/barrier boundaries $x=0$ and $x=L$, the relations between the coefficients are found, which allows $T$ to be found as:

$$T=\frac{|A_3|^2}{|A_1|^2}=\frac{4E(E-V_0)}{4E(E-V_0)+V_0^2 \sin^2 \left[\sqrt{2m(E-V_0)}\frac{L}{\hbar}\right]}$$

It follows that the transmission coefficient $T$ reaches its maximum value of 1 when:

$$\sin^2\left [\sqrt{2m(E-V_0)}\frac{L}{\hbar}\right]=0\text{, or }\sqrt{2m(E-V_0)}=\frac{n\pi\hbar}{L}$$

for any integer value $n$. This is the resonance condition, which leads to the peaking of $T$ to its maxima, called resonance.

=== Physical picture (Standing de Broglie Waves and the Fabry-Pérot Etalon) ===
From the above expression, resonance occurs when the distance covered by the particle in traversing the well and back ($2L$) is an integer multiple of the De Broglie wavelength of a particle inside the potential ($\lambda=\frac{2\pi}{k}$). For $E>V_0$, reflections at potential discontinuities are not accompanied by any phase change. Therefore, resonances correspond to the formation of standing waves within the potential barrier/well. At resonance, the waves incident on the potential at $x=0$ and the waves reflecting between the walls of the potential are in phase, and reinforce each other. Far from resonances, standing waves can't be formed. Then, waves reflecting between both walls of the potential (at $x=0$ and $x=L$) and the wave transmitted through $x=0$ are out of phase, and destroy each other by interference. The physics is similar to that of transmission in Fabry–Pérot interferometer in optics, where the resonance condition and functional form of the transmission coefficient are the same.

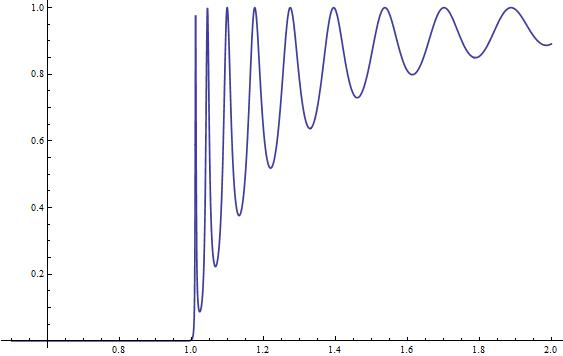
Plot of the transmission co-efficient against (E/V_{0}) for a shape factor of 30

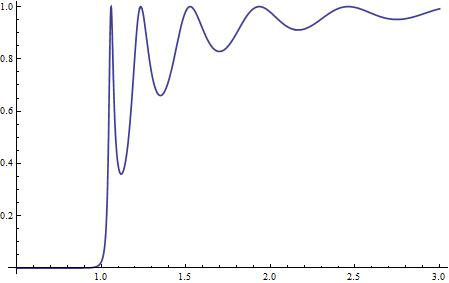
Plot of the transmission co-efficient against (E/V_{0}) for a shape factor of 13

=== Nature of resonance curves ===
The transmission coefficient swings between its maximum of 1 and minimum of $\left[1+\frac{V_0^2}{4E(E-V_0)}\right]^{-1}$as a function of the length of square well ($L$) with a period of $\frac{\pi}{k_2}$. The minima of the transmission tend to $1$ in the limit of large energy $E>>V_0$, resulting in more shallow resonances, and inversely tend to $0$ in the limit of low energy $E<<V_0$, resulting in sharper resonances. This is demonstrated in plots of transmission coefficient against incident particle energy for fixed values of the shape factor, defined as $\sqrt{\frac{2mV_0 L^{2}}{\hbar^{2}}}$

== See also ==
- Resonance (particle physics)
- Levinson's theorem
- Feshbach–Fano partitioning
