= McKay's approximation for the coefficient of variation =

In statistics, McKay's approximation of the coefficient of variation is a statistic based on a sample from a normally distributed population. It was introduced in 1932 by A. T. McKay. Statistical methods for the coefficient of variation often utilizes McKay's approximation.

Let $x_i$, $i = 1, 2,\ldots, n$ be $n$ independent observations from a $N(\mu, \sigma^2)$ normal distribution. The population coefficient of variation is $c_v = \sigma / \mu$. Let $\bar{x}$ and $s \,$ denote the sample mean and the sample standard deviation, respectively. Then $\hat{c}_v = s/\bar{x}$ is the sample coefficient of variation. McKay's approximation is

$$K = \left( 1 + \frac{1}{c_v^2} \right) \ \frac{(n - 1) \ \hat{c}_v^2}{1 + (n - 1) \ \hat{c}_v^2/n}$$

Note that in this expression, the first factor includes the population coefficient of variation, which is usually unknown. When $c_v$ is smaller than 1/3, then $K$ is approximately chi-square distributed with $n - 1$ degrees of freedom. In the original article by McKay, the expression for $K$ looks slightly different, since McKay defined $\sigma^2$ with denominator $n$ instead of $n - 1$. McKay's approximation, $K$, for the coefficient of variation is approximately chi-square distributed, but exactly noncentral beta distributed .
