= Fano factor =

Statistics concept

In statistics, the Fano factor, like the coefficient of variation, is a measure of the dispersion of a counting process. It was originally used to measure the Fano noise in ion detectors. It is named after Ugo Fano, an Italian-American physicist.

The Fano factor after a time $t$ is defined as

$$F(t)=\frac{\sigma_t^2}{\mu_t},$$

where $\sigma_t$ is the standard deviation and $\mu_t$ is the mean number of events of a counting process after some time $t$. The Fano factor can be viewed as a kind of noise-to-signal ratio; it is a measure of the reliability with which the waiting time random variable can be estimated after several random events.

For a Poisson counting process, the variance in the count equals the mean count, so $F=1$.

== Definition ==
For a counting process $N_t$, the Fano factor after a time $t>0$ is defined as,

$$F(t)=\frac{\operatorname{Var}(N_t)}{\operatorname{E}[N_t]}.$$

Sometimes, the long-term limit is also termed the Fano factor,

$$F=\lim_{t\to\infty}F(t).$$

For a renewal process with holding times distributed similar to a random variable $S$, we have that,

$F = \lim_{t\to\infty} F(t) = \lim_{t\to\infty} \frac{\operatorname{Var}(N_t)}{\operatorname{E}[N_t]} = \frac{\operatorname{Var}(S)}{\operatorname{E}[S]^2}.$

Since we have that the right-hand side is equal to the square of the coefficient of variation $c_v^2=\operatorname{Var}(S)/\operatorname{E}[S]^2$, the right-hand side of this equation is sometimes referred to as the Fano factor as well.

== Interpretation ==
When considered as the dispersion of the number, the Fano factor $F$ roughly corresponds to the width of the peak of $N_t$. As such, the Fano factor is often interpreted as the unpredictability of the underlying process.

=== Example: Constant Random Variable ===
When the holding times are constant, then $F=0$. As such, if $F\approx0$ then we interpret the renewal process as being very predictable.

=== Example: Poisson Counting Process ===
When the likelihood of an event occurring in any time interval is equal for all time, then the holding times must be exponentially distributed, giving a Poisson counting process, for which $F=1$.

== Use in particle detection ==
In particle detectors, the Fano factor results from the energy loss in a collision not being purely statistical. The process giving rise to each individual charge carrier is not independent as the number of ways an atom may be ionized is limited by the discrete electron shells. The net result is a better energy resolution than predicted by purely statistical considerations. For example, if w is the average energy for a particle to produce a charge carrier in a detector, then the relative FWHM resolution for measuring the particle energy E is:

$$R = \frac{\mathrm{FWHM}}{\mu} = 2.35 \sqrt{\frac{F w}{E}},$$

where the factor of 2.35 relates the standard deviation to the FWHM.

The Fano factor is material-specific. Its value shows an empirical correlation with $W/I$ for gases, $F=0.188 W/I - 0.15$, where W is the mean energy required to form an ionisation pair and I is the ionisation potential. Some theoretical F values are:

| Si: | 0.115 (note discrepancy to experimental value) |
| Ge: | 0.13 |
| GaAs: | 0.12 |
| Diamond: | 0.08 |

Measuring the Fano factor is difficult because many factors contribute to the resolution, but some experimental values are:

| Si: | 0.128 ± 0.001 (at 5.9 keV) / 0.159 ± 0.002 (at 122 keV) |
| Ar (gas): | 0.20 ± 0.01/0.02 |
| Xe (gas): | 0.13 to 0.29 |
| CZT: | 0.089 ± 0.005 |

== Use in neuroscience ==
The Fano factor is used in neuroscience to describe variability in neural spiking. In this context, the events are the neural spiking events and the holding times are the Inter-Spike Intervals (ISI). Often, the limit definition of the Fano factor is used, for which,

$F = \lim_{t\to\infty} \frac{\operatorname{Var}(N_t)}{\operatorname{E}[N_t]} = \frac{\operatorname{Var}(ISI)}{(\operatorname{E}[ISI])^2} = CV^2,$

where $CV$ is the coefficient of variation of ISI.

Some neurons are found to have varying ISI distributions, meaning that the counting process is no longer a renewal process. Rather, a Markov renewal process is used. In the case that we have only two Markov states with equal transition probabilities $p$, we have that the limit above again converges, $F= 2\frac{CV_2^2\mu_1^2 + CV_1^2\mu_2^2}{(\mu_1 + \mu_2)^2} + \left(\frac{1}{p}-1\right)\frac{(\mu_1-\mu_2)^2}{(\mu_1+\mu_2)^2},$ where $\mu$ represents the mean for the ISI of the corresponding state.

While most work assumes a constant Fano factor, recent work has considered neurons with non-constant Fano factors. In this case, it is found that non-constant Fano factors can be achieved by introducing both noise and non-linearity to the rate of the underlying Poisson process.

== See also ==
- Fano noise
- Index of dispersion – equivalent to the Fano factor for an infinite time window.
- Ugo Fano
