= Index of dispersion =

Normalized measure of the dispersion of a probability distribution

In probability theory and statistics, the index of dispersion, dispersion index, coefficient of dispersion, relative variance, or variance-to-mean ratio (VMR), like the coefficient of variation, is a normalized measure of the dispersion of a probability distribution: it is a measure used to quantify whether a set of observed occurrences are clustered or dispersed compared to a standard statistical model.

It is defined as the ratio of the variance $\sigma^2$ to the mean $\mu$,

$$D = {\sigma^2 \over \mu }.$$

It is also known as the Fano factor, though this term is sometimes reserved for windowed data (the mean and variance are computed over a subpopulation), where the index of dispersion is used in the special case where the window is infinite. Windowing data is frequently done: the VMR is frequently computed over various intervals in time or small regions in space, which may be called "windows", and the resulting statistic called the Fano factor.

It is only defined when the mean $\mu$ is non-zero, and is generally only used for positive statistics, such as count data or time between events, or where the underlying distribution is assumed to be the exponential distribution or Poisson distribution.

== Terminology ==
In this context, the observed dataset may consist of the times of occurrence of predefined events, such as earthquakes in a given region over a given magnitude, or of the locations in geographical space of plants of a given species. Details of such occurrences are first converted into counts of the numbers of events or occurrences in each of a set of equal-sized time- or space-regions.

The above defines a dispersion index for counts. A different definition applies for a dispersion index for intervals, where the quantities treated are the lengths of the time-intervals between the events. Common usage is that "index of dispersion" means the dispersion index for counts.

== Interpretation ==
Some distributions, most notably the Poisson distribution, have equal variance and mean, giving them a VMR = 1. The geometric distribution and the negative binomial distribution have VMR > 1, while the binomial distribution has VMR < 1, and the constant random variable has VMR = 0. This yields the following table:

| Distribution | VMR |
|---|---|---|
| constant random variable | VMR = 0 | not dispersed |
| binomial distribution | 0 < VMR < 1 | under-dispersed |
| Poisson distribution | VMR = 1 |
| negative binomial distribution | VMR > 1 | over-dispersed |

This can be considered analogous to the classification of conic sections by eccentricity; see Cumulants of particular probability distributions for details.

The relevance of the index of dispersion is that it has a value of 1 when the probability distribution of the number of occurrences in an interval is a Poisson distribution. Thus the measure can be used to assess whether observed data can be modeled using a Poisson process. When the coefficient of dispersion is less than 1, a dataset is said to be "under-dispersed": this condition can relate to patterns of occurrence that are more regular than the randomness associated with a Poisson process. For instance, regular, periodic events will be under-dispersed. If the index of dispersion is larger than 1, a dataset is said to be over-dispersed.

A sample-based estimate of the dispersion index can be used to construct a formal statistical hypothesis test for the adequacy of the model that a series of counts follow a Poisson distribution. In terms of the interval-counts, over-dispersion corresponds to there being more intervals with low counts and more intervals with high counts, compared to a Poisson distribution: in contrast, under-dispersion is characterised by there being more intervals having counts close to the mean count, compared to a Poisson distribution.

The VMR is also a good measure of the degree of randomness of a given phenomenon. For example, this technique is commonly used in currency management.

== Example ==
For randomly diffusing particles (Brownian motion), the distribution of the number of particle inside a given volume is poissonian, i.e. VMR=1. Therefore, to assess if a given spatial pattern (assuming you have a way to measure it) is due purely to diffusion or if some particle-particle interaction is involved : divide the space into patches, Quadrats or Sample Units (SU), count the number of individuals in each patch or SU, and compute the VMR. VMRs significantly higher than 1 denote a clustered distribution, where random walk is not enough to smother the attractive inter-particle potential.

== History ==
The first to discuss the use of a test to detect deviations from a Poisson or binomial distribution appears to have been Lexis in 1877. One of the tests he developed was the Lexis ratio.

This index was first used in botany by Clapham in 1936.

Hoel studied the first four moments of its distribution. He found that the approximation to the χ^{2} statistic is reasonable if μ > 5.

== Skewed distributions ==
For highly skewed distributions, it may be more appropriate to use a linear loss function, as opposed to a quadratic one. The analogous coefficient of dispersion in this case is the ratio of the average absolute deviation from the median to the median of the data, or, in symbols:

$$CD = \frac{1}{n}\frac{\sum_j{|m - x_j|}}{ m }$$

where n is the sample size, m is the sample median and the sum taken over the whole sample. Iowa, New York and South Dakota use this linear coefficient of dispersion to estimate dues taxes.

For a two-sample test in which the sample sizes are large, both samples have the same median, and differ in the dispersion around it, a confidence interval for the linear coefficient of dispersion is bounded inferiorly by

$$\frac{t_a}{t_b}\exp{\left(-\sqrt{z_\alpha \left( \operatorname{var} \left[ \log \left( \frac{t_a} {t_b} \right) \right] \right)}\right)}$$

where t_{j} is the mean absolute deviation of the j^{th} sample and z_{α} is the confidence interval length for a normal distribution of confidence α (e.g., for α = 0.05, z_{α} = 1.96).

== See also ==
- Count data
- Harmonic mean

=== Similar ratios ===
- Coefficient of variation, $\sigma/\mu$
- Standardized moment, $\mu_k/\sigma^k$
- Fano factor, $\sigma^2_W/\mu_W$ (windowed VMR)
- signal-to-noise ratio, $\mu/\sigma$ (in signal processing)
