= Fano noise =

Fano noise is a fluctuation of an electric charge obtained in a detector (in spite of constant value of the measured quantity, which is usually an energy), arising from processes in the detector.

It was first described by Ugo Fano in 1947, as a fluctuation of amount of ion pairs produced by a charged particle of high energy in a gas. The amount of the ion pairs is proportional to the energy the particle loses in the gas, but with some error - due to the Fano noise. Surprisingly, the noise is usually smaller than a Poisson distribution noise (in which the variance is equal to the value - note the variance is average squared distance from the expected value), showing there is an interaction between ionization acts. A Fano factor was introduced to describe it, and the factor is almost independent of the energy measured (Fano computed it to change from 0.43 to 0.47 for ionization of atomic hydrogen by electrons of energy from 1keV to 100keV). Fano expected it to be between 1/3 and 1/2 for gases, for moderate energies of ionizing particles.

The Fano noise applies as well to other processes in which an energy is converted to an electric charge - solid state detectors of charged particles and gamma radiation, and even semiconductor light detectors like image sensors. E.g. it is a limiting factor in the noise characteristics of CCDs and CMOS image sensors. The Fano factor achievable is an important parameter of the detector material – the smaller it is the better.

== See also ==
- Noise (signal processing)
- Fano factor
