= Enrico Persico =

Italian physicist

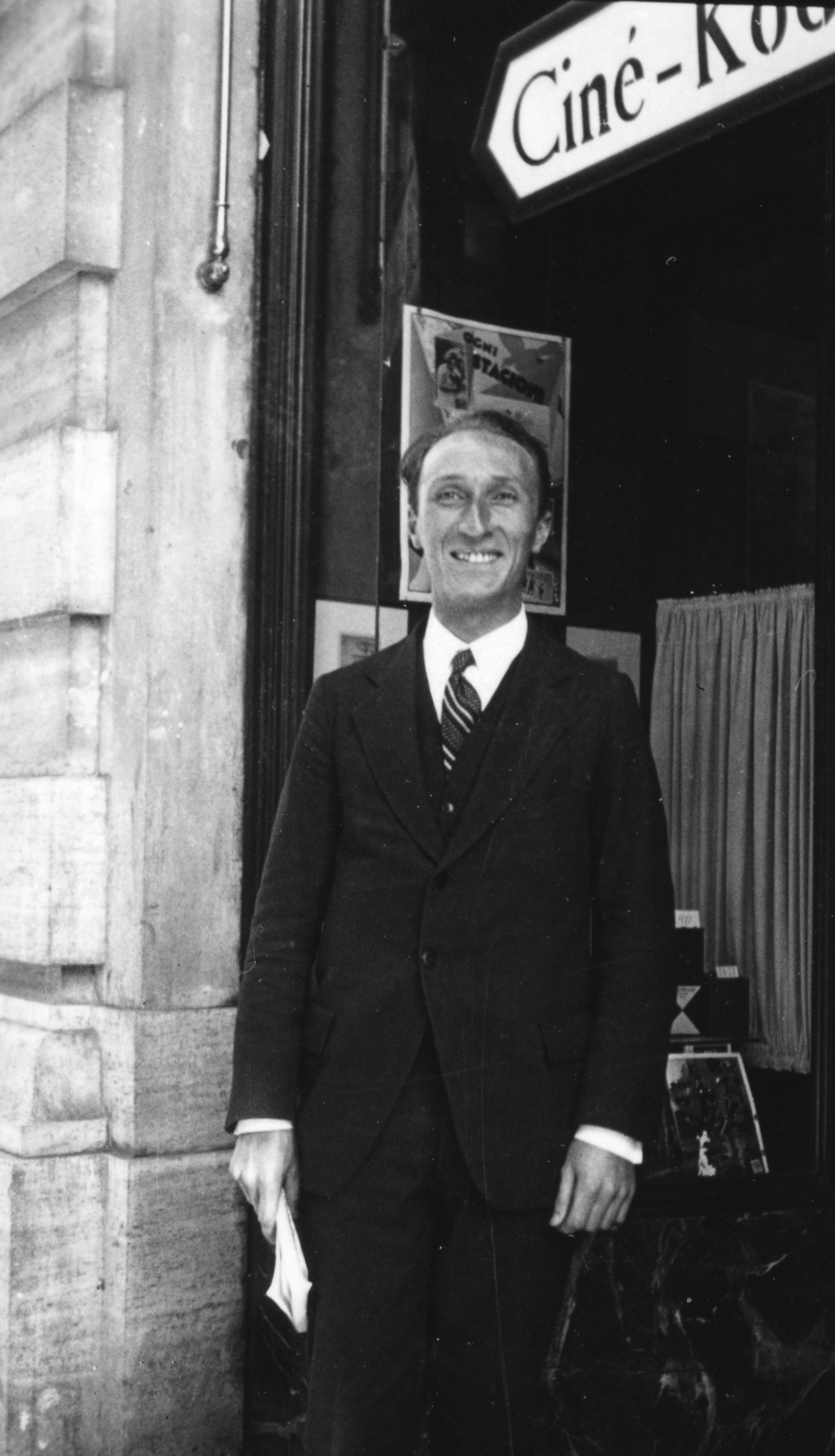
- Persico in Rome, Italy
- Born: 9 August 1900
- Died: 17 June 1969 (aged 68)
- Scientific career
- Fields: Quantum mechanics
- Institutions: University of Turin
- Doctoral students: Ugo Fano

Enrico Persico (9 August 1900 – 17 June 1969) was an Italian physicist notable for propagating the field of quantum mechanics in Italy. He was a professor at the University of Turin and is also notable as the doctoral advisor of Ugo Fano.

== Career ==
Persico was born in Rome on 9 August 1900. During his university years, his friendship with Enrico Fermi intensified. He graduated in 1921. In 1926 he was already teaching physics at the University of Rome, and co-authored with Fermi on the topic of wave mechanics. He then moved to Florence, where he organized lectures on wave mechanics. At the end of 1930, he was called to Turin. From Turin he maintained relationships with Fermi. He was a witness to the discovery of the slowing down of neutrons and recorded results of the readings of the counters used by Fermi in order to measure the activity induced by neutrons in particles of silver, with and without the presence of paraffin. In the autumn of 1949, Persico, discouraged from the oppressive atmosphere of the post-war period, accepted a position in Canada, taking the place of Franco Rasetti. In the autumn of 1950 he returned to Rome, to take up the advanced Physical Chair. He continued an interest in optoelectronics, an area that he had already cultivated in Canada. In 1953, Persico directed the theoretical work that underpinned the construction of a 1.1 GeV synchrotron. He also developed the general theory of loaded particle injection in particle accelerators.

== Books by Persico ==
- Fundamentals of Quantum Mechanics (1950)
- Gli atomi e la loro energia (1959)
- Principles of particle accelerators (1968)
