= Ugo Fano =

Italian physicist (1912–2001)

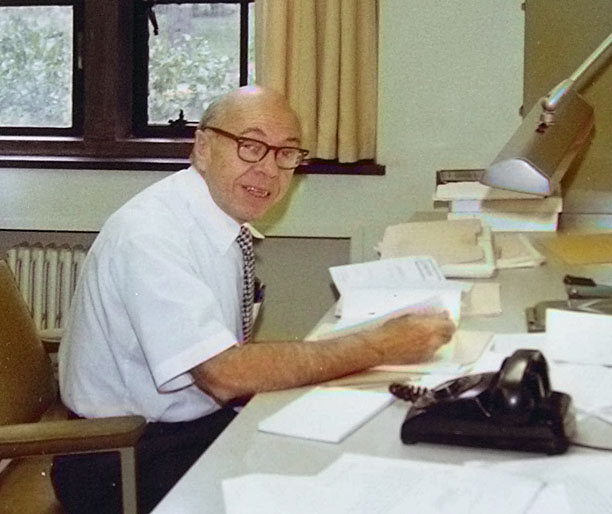
- Fano in 1978
- Born: July 28, 1912; Turin, Italy
- Died: February 13, 2001 (aged 88); Chicago, Illinois
- Education: University of Turin
- Known for: Lu–Fano plot Feshbach–Fano partitioning Fano resonance Fano factor Fano effect Fano–Lichten mechanism Beutler-Fano profile Fano noise
- Awards: Enrico Fermi Award (1995); William F. Meggers Award (1989); Davisson–Germer Prize (1976); Fellow of the Royal Society
- Scientific career
- Fields: Physicist and Biophysicist
- Workplaces: University of Chicago; Carnegie Institute; National Institute of Standards and Technology; University of Rome; University of Leipzig
- Doctoral advisor: Enrico Persico
- Other academic advisors: Enrico Fermi; Werner Heisenberg
- Doctoral students: Chris H. Greene

Notes
- His father was Gino Fano, he is the brother of Robert Fano, and the cousin of Giulio Racah.

Ugo Fano (July 28, 1912 – February 13, 2001) was an Italian American physicist, notable for contributions to theoretical physics.

== Biography ==
Ugo Fano was born into a wealthy Jewish family in Turin, Italy. His father was Gino Fano, a professor of mathematics.

=== University studies ===
Fano earned his doctorate in mathematics at the University of Turin in 1934, under Enrico Persico, with a thesis entitled Sul Calcolo dei Termini Spettrali e in Particolare dei Potenziali di Ionizzazione Nella Meccanica Quantistica (On the Quantum Mechanical Calculation Spectral Terms and their Extension to Ionization). As part of his PhD examination he also made two oral presentations entitled: Sulle Funzioni di Due o Più Variabili Complesse (On the functions of two or more complex variables) and Le Onde Elettromagnetiche di Maggi: Le Connessioni Asimmetriche Nella Geometria Non Riemanniana (Maggi electromagnetic waves: asymmetric connections in non-Riemannian geometry).

=== European years ===
Fano worked with Enrico Fermi in Rome, where he was a senior member of 'Via Panisperna boys'. It was during this period that with the urging of Fermi, Fano developed his seminal theory of resonant configuration interaction (Fano resonance profile), which led to two papers, in 1935 and 1961. The latter is one of the most cited articles published in the Physical Review.

Fano spent 1936–37 with Werner Heisenberg in Leipzig.

=== Career in the United States ===
In 1939, he married Camilla Lattes, also known as Lilla, a teacher who would collaborate with him in a well-known book on atomic and molecular physics, Physics of Atoms and Molecules (1959). Appendix III of this book presents an elementary description of the collision of two charged particles, which was used by Richard Feynman in lectures that have been published as Feynman's Lost Lecture: Motion of Planets Around the Sun. An expanded version of this book was subsequently published as Basic Physics of Atoms and Molecules (1972).

Later in 1939, he immigrated to the United States due to increasing antisemitic measures taking effect in Italy. His initial work in the U.S. was on bacteriophages and pioneering work in the study of radiological physics, specifically, the differences in the biological effects of X-rays and neutrons.

After serving a stint at the Aberdeen Proving Ground during World War II, he joined the staff of the National Bureau of Standards (NBS, now the National Institute of Standards and Technology), where he was hired as the first theoretical physicist on the NBS staff. He served there until 1966, when he joined the faculty of physics at the University of Chicago. There he trained, until the early 1990s, about thirty graduate students and postdoctoral research associates, many of whom now occupy leading positions in theoretical atomic and molecular physics in the United States, Europe, and Japan.

=== Scientific legacy ===
Fano had a major impact in sustained work over six decades on atomic physics and molecular physics, and earlier on radiological physics. Most areas of current research in these subjects reflect his fundamental contributions. Such phenomena as the Fano resonance profile, the Fano factor, the Fano effect, the Lu-Fano plot, and the Fano–Lichten mechanism bear his name. The Fano theorem used in radiation dosimetry is also a result of his work.

== Family ==
His brother, Robert Fano, was an eminent professor emeritus of electrical engineering at MIT. Fano's cousin, Giulio Racah, made great contributions to the quantum theory of angular momentum (well known as Racah algebra), and wrote a concise monograph with Fano on the subject (Irreducible Tensorial Sets, 1959).

== Honors ==
Fano was a member of the National Academy of Sciences, a fellow of the American Academy of Arts and Sciences, the American Physical Society and a Foreign Member of the Royal Society of London.

In 1989 he was awarded the William F. Meggers Award by the Optical Society.

He was awarded the Enrico Fermi Award of the U.S. Department of Energy in 1995. His most-cited work is the 1961 paper mentioned above.

The July–to September 2000 issue of Physics Essays was dedicated to Ugo Fano, including a posthumous paper from Fano.
