= Feshbach–Fano partitioning =

In quantum mechanics, and in particular in scattering theory, the Feshbach–Fano method, named after Herman Feshbach and Ugo Fano, separates (partitions) the resonant and the background components of the wave function and therefore of the associated quantities like cross sections or phase shift. This approach allows us to define rigorously the concept of resonance in quantum mechanics.

In general, the partitioning formalism is based on the definition of two complementary projectors P and Q such that

P + Q = 1.

The subspaces onto which P and Q project are sets of states obeying the continuum and the bound state boundary conditions respectively. P and Q are interpreted as the projectors on the background and the resonant subspaces respectively.

The projectors P and Q are not defined within the Feshbach–Fano method. This is its major power as well as its major weakness. On the one hand, this makes the method very general and, on the other hand, it introduces some arbitrariness which is difficult to control. Some authors define first the P space as an approximation to the background scattering but most authors define first the Q space as an approximation to the resonance. This step relies always on some physical intuition which is not easy to quantify. In practice P or Q should be chosen such that the resulting background scattering phase or cross-section is slowly depending on the scattering energy in the neighbourhood of the resonances (this is the so-called flat continuum hypothesis). If one succeeds in translating the flat continuum hypothesis in a mathematical form, it is possible to generate a set of equations defining P and Q on a less arbitrary basis.

The aim of the Feshbach–Fano method is to solve the Schrödinger equation governing a scattering process (defined by the Hamiltonian H) in two steps: First by solving the scattering problem ruled by the background Hamiltonian PHP. It is often supposed that the solution of this problem is trivial or at least fulfilling some standard hypotheses which allow to skip its full resolution. Second by solving the resonant scattering problem corresponding to the effective complex (energy dependent) Hamiltonian

$$H_\mathrm{eff} (E) = QHQ + \lim_{\varepsilon \to 0} QHP{1 \over E + i \varepsilon -PHP}PHQ = QHQ + \Delta(E) - i \Gamma(E)/2, \,$$

whose dimension is equal to the number of interacting resonances and depends parametrically on the scattering energy E. The resonance parameters $E_\mathrm{res}$ and $\Gamma_\mathrm{res}$ are obtained by solving the so-called implicit equation

$$\det[H_\mathrm{eff}(z)-z]=0 \,$$

for z in the lower complex plane. The solution

$$z_\mathrm{res} = E_\mathrm{res}-i\Gamma_\mathrm{res} \,$$

is the resonance pole. If $z_\mathrm{res}$ is close to the real axis it gives rise to a Breit–Wigner or a Fano profile in the corresponding cross section. Both resulting T matrices have to be added in order to obtain the T matrix corresponding to the full scattering problem :

$$T_\mathrm{total}=T_\mathrm{background}+T_\mathrm{resonances}. \,$$

== See also ==
- Resonance (particle physics)
- Resonances in scattering from potentials
- Feshbach resonance
- Fano resonance
