= Optical ring resonators =

Set of waveguides including a closed loop

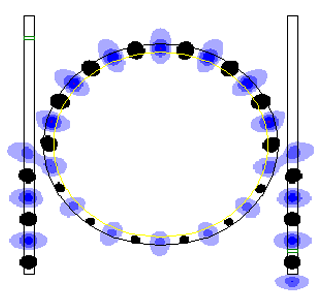
A computer-simulated ring resonator depicting continuous wave input at resonance.

An optical ring resonator, or micro-ring resonator (MRR) is a set of waveguides in which at least one is a closed loop coupled to light input and output. The input and output can be, but are not limited to being, waveguides. Geometries behind optical ring resonators are the same as those behind whispering galleries except that they use light and obey the properties behind constructive interference and total internal reflection. When light of the resonant wavelength is passed through the closed loop from the input waveguide, the light builds up in intensity over multiple round-trips owing to constructive interference and is coupled to the output waveguide. Because only a narrow wavelength range will be at resonance within the loop geometry, the optical ring resonator functions as a filter. Additionally, two or more ring waveguides can be coupled to each other to form an add/drop optical filter or to send light in a preferred direction.

== Background ==
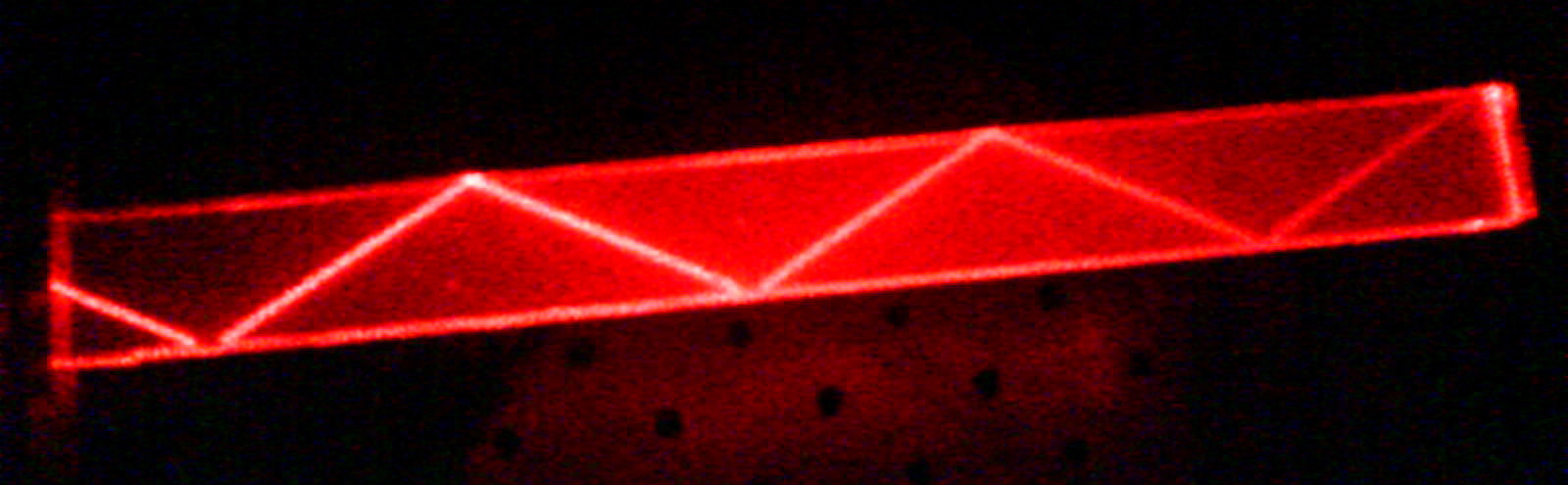
Total internal reflection in PMMA

Optical ring resonators work on the principles behind total internal reflection, constructive interference, and optical coupling.

=== Total internal reflection ===
The light travelling through the waveguides in an optical ring resonator remains within the waveguides due to the phenomenon known as total internal reflection (TIR). TIR is an optical phenomenon that occurs when a ray of light strikes the boundary of a medium and fails to refract through the boundary. Given that the angle of incidence is larger than the critical angle (with respect to the normal of the surface) and the refractive index is lower on the other side of the boundary relative to the incident ray, TIR will occur and no light will be able to pass through the boundary. For an optical ring resonator to work well, total internal reflection conditions must be met and the light travelling through the waveguides must not be allowed to escape by any means.

=== Interference ===
Interference is the process by which two waves superimpose to form a resultant wave of greater(constructive) or less(destructive) amplitude. Interference usually refers to the interaction of two distinct waves and it is a result of the linearity of Maxwell's equations. Interference could be constructive or destructive depending on the relative phase of the two waves. In maximum constructive interference, the two waves have the same phase and, as a result, interfere in a way that the resulting wave amplitude will be equal to the sum of the two individual amplitudes. As the light in an optical ring resonator completes multiple circuits around the ring component, it interferes with existing light still in the loop building up amplitude over time resulting in a set time of 100s of ns. Assuming there are no losses in the system such as those due to absorption, evanescence, or imperfect coupling and the resonance condition is met, the intensity of the light emitted from a ring resonator will be equal to the intensity of the light fed into the system.

=== Optical coupling ===
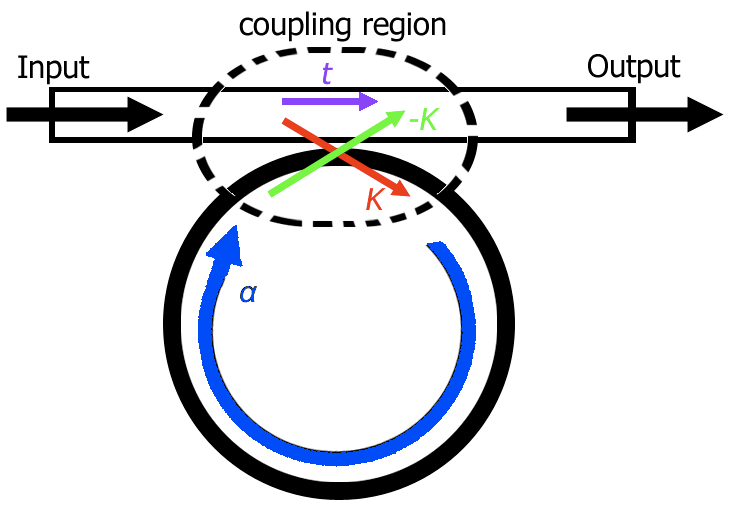
A pictorial representation of the coupling coefficients

Visualization of: how the light from a point source is guided by a waveguide, how the waveguide is coupled to a ring resonator, and how the ring resonator is in turn coupled to another waveguide.

Important for understanding how an optical ring resonator works, is the concept of how the linear waveguides are coupled to the ring waveguide. When a beam of light passes through a wave guide as shown in the graph on the right, part of light will be coupled into the optical ring resonator. The reason for this is the phenomenon of the evanescent field, which extends outside of the waveguide mode in an exponentially decreasing radial profile. In other words, if the ring and the waveguide are brought closely together, some light from the waveguide can couple into the ring. Optical coupling is affected by three aspects

1. Distance
2. Coupling length
3. Refractive indices of the waveguide and the optical ring resonator.

In order to optimize the coupling, it is usually the case to narrow the distance between the ring resonator and the waveguide. The closer the distance, the easier the optical coupling happens. In addition, the coupling length affects the coupling as well. The coupling length represents the effective curve length of the ring resonator for the coupling phenomenon to happen with the waveguide. It has been studied that as the optical coupling length increases, the difficulty for the coupling to happen decreases. Furthermore, the refractive index of the waveguide material, the ring resonator material and the medium material in between the waveguide and the ring resonator also affect the optical coupling. The medium material is usually the most important feature under study since it has a great effect on the transmission of the light wave. The refractive index of the medium can be either large or small according to various applications and purposes.

To maximize power transfer from the input waveguide to the optical ring resonator, critical coupling is the target. The critical coupling shows that no light is passing through the waveguide after the light beam is coupled into the optical ring resonator. The light will be stored and lost inside the resonator thereafter. Lossless coupling is when no light is transmitted all the way through the input waveguide to its own output; instead, all of the light is coupled into the ring waveguide (such as what is depicted in the image at the top of this page). For lossless coupling to occur, the following equation must be satisfied:

$$|\Kappa|^2 + |t|^2 = \mathbf{1}$$

where t is the transmission coefficient through the coupler and $\Kappa$ is the taper-sphere mode coupling amplitude, also referred to as the coupling coefficient.

== Theory ==
To understand how optical ring resonators work, we must first understand the optical path length difference (OPD) of a ring resonator. This is given as follows for a single-ring ring resonator:

$$\mathbf{OPD} = 2 \pi r n_\text{eff}$$

where r is the radius of the ring resonator and $n_\text{eff}$ is the effective index of refraction of the waveguide material. Due to the total internal reflection requirement, $n_\text{eff}$ must be greater than the index of refraction of the surrounding fluid in which the resonator is placed (e.g. air). For resonance to take place, the following resonant condition must be satisfied:

$$\mathbf{OPD} = m \lambda_{m}$$

where $\lambda_{m}$ is the resonant wavelength and m is the mode number of the ring resonator. This equation means that in order for light to interfere constructively inside the ring resonator, the circumference of the ring must be an integer multiple of the wavelength of the light. As such, the mode number must be a positive integer for resonance to take place. As a result, when the incident light contains multiple wavelengths (such as white light), only the resonant wavelengths will be able to pass through the ring resonator fully.

The quality factor and the finesse of an optical ring resonator can be quantitatively described using the following formulas (see: eq: 2.37 in, or eq:19+20 in, or eq:12+19 in):

$$\mathbf{Q} = \frac{\nu}{\delta\nu}$$
$$\mathcal{F} = \frac{\nu_{f}}{\delta\nu}$$

where $\mathcal{F}$ is the finesse of the ring resonator, $\nu$ is the operation frequency, $\nu_{f}$ is the free spectral range and $\delta\nu$ is the full-width half-max of the transmission spectra. The quality factor is useful in determining the spectral range of the resonance condition for any given ring resonator. The quality factor is also useful for quantifying the amount of losses in the resonator as a low $Q$ factor is usually due to large losses.

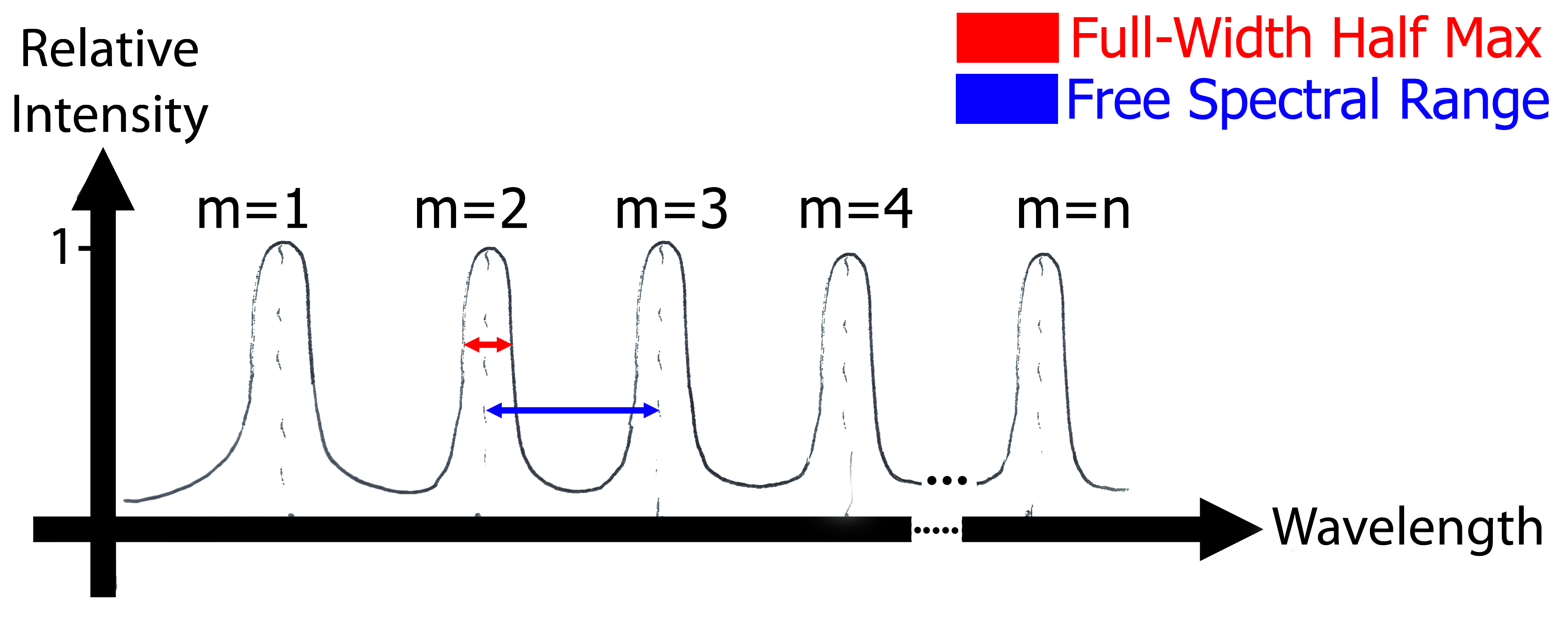
A transmission spectra depicting multiple resonant modes ($m=1,m=2,m=3,\dots,m=n$) and the free spectral range.

== Double ring resonators ==
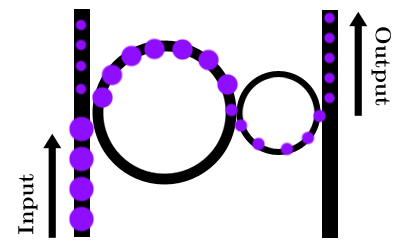
A double ring resonator with rings of varying radii in series showing the relative intensities of light passing through on the first cycle. Note that the light passing through a double ring resonator would more often travel in multiple loops around each ring rather than as pictured.

In a double ring resonator, two ring waveguides are used instead of one. They may be arranged in series (as shown on the right) or in parallel. When using two ring waveguides in series, the output of the double ring resonator will be in the same direction as the input (albeit with a lateral shift). When the input light meets the resonance condition of the first ring, it will couple into the ring and travel around inside of it. As subsequent loops around the first ring bring the light to the resonance condition of the second ring, the two rings will be coupled together and the light will be passed into the second ring. By the same method, the light will then eventually be transferred into the bus output waveguide. Therefore, in order to transmit light through a double ring resonator system, we will need to satisfy the resonant condition for both rings as follows:

$$\ 2 \pi n_{1} R_{1} = m_{1} \lambda_{1}$$

$$\ 2 \pi n_{2} R_{2} = m_{2} \lambda_{2}$$

where $m_{1}$ and $m_{2}$ are the mode numbers of the first and second ring respectively and they must remain as positive integer numbers. For the light to exit the ring resonator to the output bus waveguide, the wavelength of the light in each ring must be same. That is, $\lambda_{1} = \lambda_{2}$ for resonance to occur. As such, we get the following equation governing resonance:

$$\ \frac{n_{1} R_{1}}{m_{1}} = \frac{n_{2} R_{2}}{m_{2}}$$

Note that both $m_{1}$ and $m_{2}$ need to remain integers.

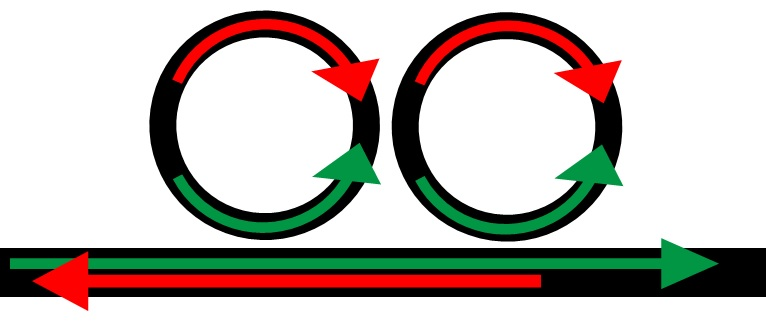
Optical mirror (reflector) made of a double ring system coupled to a single waveguide. Forward propagating waves in the waveguide (green) excite anti-clockwise traveling waves in both rings (green). Due to the inter-resonator coupling, these waves generate clockwise rotating waves (red) in both rings which in turn excite backward propagating (reflected) waves (red) in the waveguide. The reflected wave exists only in the part of the waveguide to the left of the coupling point to the right ring.

A system of two ring resonators coupled to a single waveguide has also been shown to work as a tunable reflective filter (or an optical mirror). Forward propagating waves in the waveguide excite anti-clockwise rotating waves in both rings. Due to the inter-resonator coupling, these waves generate clockwise rotating waves in both rings which are in turn coupled to backward propagating (reflected) waves in the waveguide. In this context, the utilization of nested ring resonator cavities has been demonstrated in recent studies. These nested ring resonators are designed to enhance the quality factor (Q-factor) and extend the effective light–matter interaction length. These nested cavity configurations enable light to traverse the nested cavity multiple times, a number equal to the round trips of the main cavity multiplied by the round trips of the nested cavity, as depicted in Figure below.

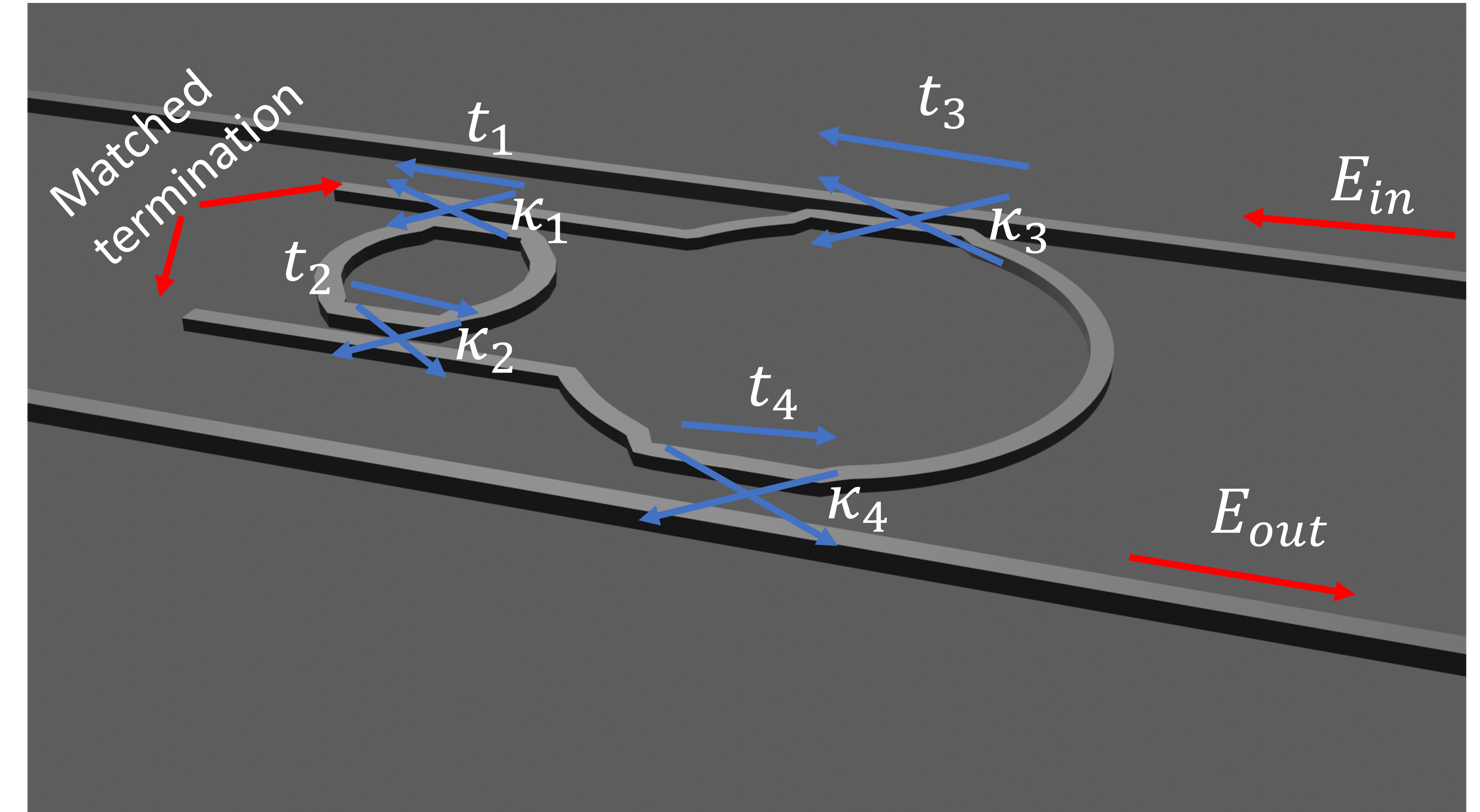
Nested Cavity Configuration: Light undergoes multiple round trips within the nested cavity, the number of which is approximately determined by the product of the round trips within the main cavity and the nested cavity.

== Applications ==
Due to the nature of the optical ring resonator and how it "filters" certain wavelengths of light passing through, it is possible to create high-order optical filters by cascading many optical ring resonators in series. This would allow for "small size, low losses, and integrability into [existing] optical networks." Additionally, since the resonance wavelengths can be changed by simply increasing or decreasing the radius of each ring, the filters can be considered tunable. This basic property can be used to create a sort of mechanical sensor. If an optical fiber experiences mechanical strain, the dimensions of the fiber will be altered, thus resulting in a change in the resonant wavelength of light emitted. This can be used to monitor fibers or waveguides for changes in their dimensions. The tuning process can be affected also by a change of refractive index using various means including thermo-optic, electro-optic or all-optical effects. Electro-optic and all-optical tuning is faster than thermal and mechanical means, and hence find various applications including in optical communication. Optical modulators with a high-Q microring are reported to yield outstandingly small power of modulation at a speed of over 50 Gbit/s at cost of a tuning power to match wavelength of the light source. A ring modulator placed in a Fabry-Perot laser cavity was reported to eliminate the tuning power by automatic matching of the laser wavelength with that of the ring modulator while maintaining high-speed ultralow-power modulation of a Si microring modulator.

Optical ring, cylindrical, and spherical resonators have also been proven useful in the field of biosensing., and a crucial research focus is the enhancement of biosensing performance One of the main benefits of using ring resonators in biosensing is the small volume of sample specimen required to obtain a given spectroscopy results in greatly reduced background Raman and fluorescence signals from the solvent and other impurities. Resonators have also been used to characterize a variety of absorption spectra for the purposes of chemical identification, particularly in the gaseous phase.

Another potential application for optical ring resonators are in the form of whispering gallery mode switches. "[Whispering Gallery Resonator] microdisk lasers are stable and switch reliably and hence, are suitable as switching elements in all-optical networks." An all-optical switch based on a high Quality factor cylindrical resonator has been proposed that allows for fast binary switching at low power.

Many researchers are interested in creating three-dimensional ring resonators with very high quality factors. These dielectric spheres, also called microsphere resonators, "were proposed as low-loss optical resonators with which to study cavity quantum electrodynamics with laser-cooled atoms or as ultrasensitive detectors for the detection of single trapped atoms.”

Ring resonators have also proved useful as single photon sources for quantum information experiments. Many materials used to fabricate ring resonator circuits have non-linear responses to light at high enough intensities. This non-linearity allows for frequency modulation processes such as four-wave mixing and Spontaneous parametric down-conversion which generate photon pairs. Ring resonators amplify the efficiency of these processes as they allow the light to circulate around the ring.

Ring resonator have been explored as logic gates and memory structures within a broader field of silicon photonics.

== See also ==
- Resonator
- Ring laser
- Total internal reflection
- Coupling (physics)
- Filter (optics)
- Optical switch
- Coupled mode theory
