= Herman Feshbach =

American physicist (1917–2000)

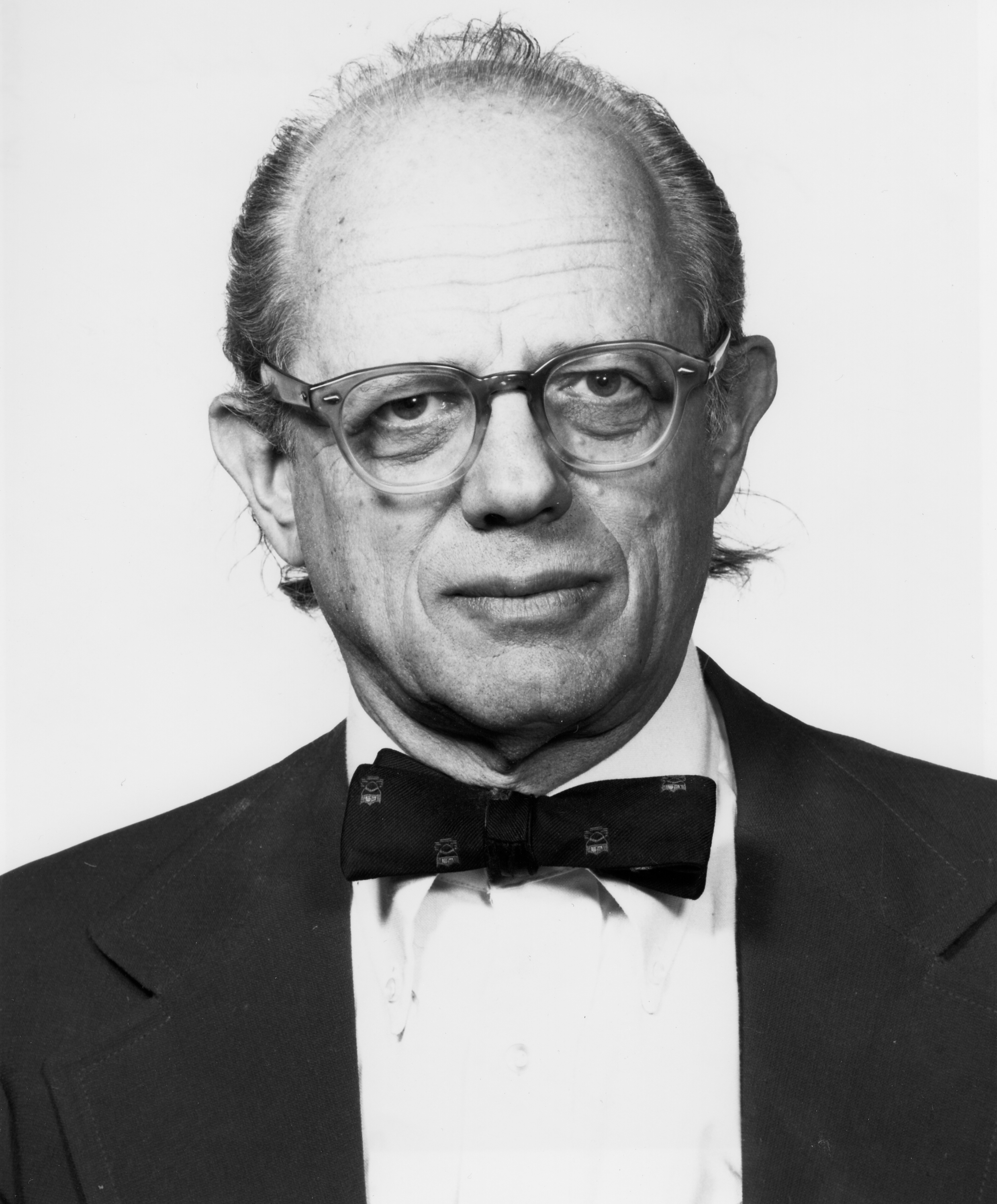
- Born: 2 February 1917; New York City, U.S.
- Died: 22 December 2000 (aged 83); Cambridge, Massachusetts, U.S.
- Education: City College of New York, Massachusetts Institute of Technology
- Known for: Feshbach resonance
- Awards: Guggenheim Fellowship, National Medal of Science, Tom W. Bonner Prize in Nuclear Physics, Fellow of the American Physical Society
- Scientific career
- Workplaces: Massachusetts Institute of Technology
- Thesis: The theory of hydrogen three (1942)
- Doctoral students: Robert Louis Pease

Herman Feshbach (2 February 1917 – 22 December 2000) was an American physicist. He was an Institute Professor Emeritus of physics at the Massachusetts Institute of Technology. Feshbach is best known for Feshbach resonance and for writing, with Philip M. Morse, Methods of Theoretical Physics.

== Background ==
Feshbach was born in New York City and graduated from the City College of New York in 1937. He was a member of the same family as Murray Feshbach, the Sovietologist and retired Georgetown University professor. He then went on to receive his Ph.D. in physics from MIT in 1942. Feshbach attended the Shelter Island Conference of 1947.

== Career ==
Feshbach was invited to stay at MIT after he received his doctorate. He remained on the physics faculty for over fifty years. From 1967 to 1973, he was the director of MIT's Center for Theoretical Physics, and from 1973 to 1983, he was chairman of the physics department. In 1983, Feshbach was named as an institute professor, the highest faculty honor at MIT.

=== Activism ===
Feshbach was active in the nuclear disarmament movement and was a founder and first chairman of the Union of Concerned Scientists. In 1969, he participated in a protest against military research at MIT.

He became concerned about the condition of scientists behind the Iron Curtain, and worked to establish contacts between Western scientists and their Eastern Bloc counterparts. Prof. Feshbach also championed the cause of Andrei Sakharov and other Soviet refuseniks. He first met Sakharov in the mid-1970s; Feshbach wrote about meeting Sakharov after his release from internal exile, in an article that appeared in Physics Today.

Feshbach was a strong believer in equality of opportunity, especially within the scientific community. He worked to increase the number of women and minority members in both the physics department and at MIT in general. In the early 1990s, he was chairman of the MIT faculty's Equal Opportunity Committee, which made recommendations for recruiting and hiring more women and minority faculty members.

== Death ==
Feshbach died of heart failure at Youville Hospital in Cambridge. He was 83.

== Awards and honors ==
Feshbach joined the National Academy of Sciences in 1969 and was president of the American Physical Society from 1980 to 1981. From 1982 to 1986, he was president of the American Academy of Arts and Sciences.

In 1986, Feshbach was awarded the National Medal of Science.

In 1984, the physics department honored Feshbach for his decades of service by starting the annual Herman Feshbach Lectures. The physics department also has an endowed Herman Feshbach chair, established in 1999 to support theoretical physicists. It is currently held by Frank Wilczek.

The American Physical Society awards the Herman Feshbach Prize in Theoretical Nuclear Physics; it is awarded annually and was inaugurated in 2014.

== Books ==
- Feshbach, Herman; Philip M. Morse (1953). Methods of Theoretical Physics. Cambridge University Press.
- Feshbach, Herman; Amos deShalit (1974). Theoretical Nuclear Physics. Wiley.

== See also ==
- MIT Physics Department
- Feshbach resonance
- Feshbach–Fano partitioning
