= Core-excited shape resonance =

A core-excited shape resonance is a shape resonance in a system with more than one degree of freedom where, after fragmentation, one of the fragments is in an excited state. It is sometimes very difficult to distinguish a core-excited shape resonance from a Feshbach resonance.

== See also ==
See the definition of Feshbach resonances for more details.
