= Relativistic Breit–Wigner distribution =

Relativistic particle resonance and decay line broadening

The relativistic Breit–Wigner distribution (after the 1936 nuclear resonance formula of Gregory Breit and Eugene Wigner) is a continuous probability distribution with the following probability density function,
$$f(E) = \frac{k}{(E^2 - M^2)^2 + M^2 \Gamma^2},$$
where k is a constant of proportionality, equal to
$$k = \frac{2 \sqrt{2}\, M\Gamma\gamma}{\pi \sqrt{M^2 + \gamma}}, \quad
\gamma = \sqrt{M^2 (M^2 + \Gamma^2)}.$$
(This equation is written using natural units, ħ = c = 1.)

It is most often used to model resonances (unstable particles) in high-energy physics. In this case, E is the center-of-mass energy that produces the resonance, M is the mass of the resonance, and Γ is the resonance width (or decay width), related to its mean lifetime according to τ = 1/Γ. (With units included, the formula is τ = ħ/Γ.)

== Usage ==
The probability of producing the resonance at a given energy E is proportional to f(E), so that a plot of the production rate of the unstable particle as a function of energy traces out the shape of the relativistic Breit–Wigner distribution. Note that for values of E off the maximum at M such that |E^{2} − M^{2}| = MΓ, (hence |E − M| = Γ/2 for M ≫ Γ), the distribution f has attenuated to half its maximum value, which justifies the name width at half-maximum for Γ.

In the limit of vanishing width, Γ → 0, the particle becomes stable as the Lorentzian distribution f sharpens infinitely to 2Mδ(E^{2} − M^{2}), where δ is the Dirac delta function (point impulse).

In general, Γ can also be a function of E; this dependence is typically only important when Γ is not small compared to M, and the phase space-dependence of the width needs to be taken into account. (For example, in the decay of the rho meson into a pair of pions.) The factor of M^{2} that multiplies Γ^{2} should also be replaced with E^{2} (or E^{4}/M^{2}, etc.) when the resonance is wide.

The form of the relativistic Breit–Wigner distribution arises from the propagator of an unstable particle, which has a denominator of the form p^{2} − M^{2} + iMΓ. (Here, p^{2} is the square of the four-momentum carried by that particle in the tree Feynman diagram involved.) The propagator in its rest frame then is proportional to the quantum-mechanical amplitude for the decay utilized to reconstruct that resonance,
$$\frac{\sqrt{k}}{(E^2 - M^2) + iM\Gamma}.$$
The resulting probability distribution is proportional to the absolute square of the amplitude, so then the above relativistic Breit–Wigner distribution for the probability density function.

The form of this distribution is similar to the amplitude of the solution to the classical equation of motion for a driven harmonic oscillator damped and driven by a sinusoidal external force. It has the standard resonance form of the Lorentz, or Cauchy distribution, but involves relativistic variables s = p^{2}, here = E^{2}. The distribution is the solution of the differential equation for the amplitude squared w.r.t. the energy energy (frequency), in such a classical forced oscillator,
$$f'(\mathrm{E})\big[(\mathrm{E}^2 - M^2)^2 + \Gamma^2 M^2\big]
- 4 \mathrm{E} (M^2 - \mathrm{E}^2) f(\mathrm{E}) = 0,$$
or rather
$$\frac{f'(\mathrm{E})}{f(\mathrm{E})} =
\frac{4 (M^2 - \mathrm{E}^2) \mathrm{E}}{(\mathrm{E}^2 - M^2)^2 + \Gamma^2 M^2},$$
with
$$f(M) = \frac{k}{\Gamma^2 M^2}.$$

== Resonant cross-section formula ==
The cross-section for resonant production of a spin-$J$ particle of mass $M$ by the collision of two particles with spins $S_1$ and $S_2$ is generally described by the relativistic Breit–Wigner formula:
$$\sigma(E_\text{cm}) = \frac{2J + 1}{(2S_1 + 1)(2S_2 + 1)} \frac{4\pi}{p_\text{cm}^2}\left[\frac{\Gamma^2/4}{(E_\text{cm} - E_0)^2 + \Gamma^2/4}\right] B_\text{in},$$
where $E_\text{cm}$ is the centre-of-mass energy of the collision, $E_0 = Mc^2$, $p_\text{cm}$ is the centre-of-mass momentum of each of the two colliding particles, $\Gamma$ is the resonance's full width at half maximum, and $B_\text{in}$ is the branching fraction for the resonance's decay into particles $S_1$ and $S_2$. If the resonance is only being detected in a specific output channel, then the observed cross-section will be reduced by the branching fraction ($B_\text{out}$) for that decay channel.

== Gaussian broadening ==
In experiment, the incident beam that produces resonance always has some spread of energy around a central value. Usually, that is a Gaussian/normal distribution. The resulting resonance shape in this case is given by the convolution of the Breit–Wigner and the Gaussian distribution:
$$V_2(E; M, \Gamma, k, \sigma) =
\int_{-\infty}^\infty \frac{k}{(E'^2 - M^2)^2 + (M\Gamma)^2} \frac{1}{\sigma\sqrt{2\pi}} e^{-\frac{(E'-E)^2}{2\sigma^2}} \,dE'.$$

This function can be simplified by introducing new variables,
$$t = \frac{E - E'}{\sqrt{2}\,\sigma}, \quad
u_1 = \frac{E - M}{\sqrt{2}\,\sigma}, \quad
u_2 = \frac{E + M}{\sqrt{2}\,\sigma}, \quad
a = \frac{k\pi}{2\sigma^2},$$
to obtain
$$V_2(E; M, \Gamma, k, \sigma) = \frac{H_2(a, u_1, u_2)}{\sigma^2 2\sqrt{\pi}},$$
where the relativistic line broadening function has the following definition:
$$H_2(a, u_1, u_2) = \frac{a}{\pi} \int_{-\infty}^\infty \frac{e^{-t^2}}{(u_1 - t)^2 (u_2 - t)^2 + a^2} \,dt.$$

$H_2$ is the relativistic counterpart of the similar line-broadening function for the Voigt profile used in spectroscopy (see also § 7.19 of).
