= Martin Maechler =

- Martin Mächler
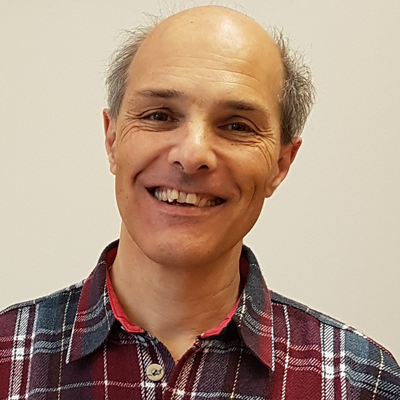
- Born: 1959 (age 66–67); Switzerland
- Citizenship: Swiss
- Education: ETH Zurich (PhD)
- Known for: Co-development of the R (programming language)
- Scientific career
- Fields: Computational statistics Robust statistics Clustering
- Workplaces: ETH Zurich
- Doctoral advisors: Frank Hampel; Hans-Rudolf Künsch

Martin Maechler (spelled Mächler in the original German) is a Swiss computational statistician and a professor emeritus at ETH Zurich (Swiss Federal Institute of Technology in Zurich). He has worked as a co-developer of R, a widely used environment for statistical computing and graphics, and is a long-time member of the R Core Development Team.

== Education and career ==
Maechler pursued his academic studies at ETH Zurich, earning a Ph.D. in mathematics in 1989 focusing on nonparametric regression and curve estimation. His doctoral advisors were Frank Hampel and Hans-Rudolf Künsch. He conducted post-doctoral research at the University of Washington's Department of Statistics for a year from August 1989 and another year at Bell Communications Research, Morristown, NJ.

He has dedicated most of his professional career to ETH Zurich's Seminar for Statistics, serving as a Senior Scientist and Lecturer before becoming an adjunct professor, and has been emeritus since March 2024. His primary areas of research and teaching include computational statistics, robust statistical methods, clustering algorithms, and numerical computations, particularly with matrices.

== R Project involvement ==
Maechler is considered a pioneer in the development of the R programming language. He joined the R Project in 1995 shortly after its inception, drawn by the open-source nature of the environment and its origin in the ACM award winning S_programming language. His motivation was to "create something meaningful for mankind," particularly aiding universities in poorer countries that benefit from the open-source model.

He is a member of the R Core Development Team and serves as the Secretary General of the R Foundation. Maechler has authored/maintained numerous R packages, including:

- Matrix: for sparse and dense matrix classes.
- cluster: provides methods for cluster analysis.
- robustbase: offering fundamental robust statistical methods.

Maechler is also a key figure in the development of Emacs Speaks Statistics (ESS), an add-on for the GNU Emacs text editor that provides dedicated support for statistical programming languages like R. He has been an ESS Core Developer since around 1997 and served as the project leader since 2004.

== Selected publications ==
Maechler has co-authored publications and R packages in the domain of linear and generalized linear mixed-effects models. One of his highly cited works is the R package lme4. He has also contributed to the field of data visualization with the scatterplot3d package.

== Personal life ==
Martin Maechler is married and has two grown sons. He is an active member of his local church and served as a member of Zurich's city council for the Evangelical People's Party of Switzerland (EVP/PEV) from 2008 to 2014. His hobbies include cross-country skiing, jogging, swimming, hiking, reading, and listening to music.
