= Andreas Buja =

Statistician and Research Scientist

- Born: Switzerland
- Education: ETHZ
- Scientific career
- Fields: Data Visualization; Multivariate statistics; Nonparametric statistics
- Thesis: (1980)
- Doctoral advisor: Frank Hampel; Peter J. Huber; Hans Föllmer
- Doctoral students: Dianne Cook
- Website: www-stat.wharton.upenn.edu/~buja/

Andreas Buja is a Swiss statistician and professor of statistics. He is the Liem Sioe Liong/First Pacific Company professor in the Statistics department of The Wharton School at the University of Pennsylvania in Philadelphia, United States. Buja joined Center for Computational Mathematics (CCM) as a Senior Research Scientist in January 2020.

== Life and education ==
Buja was born in Switzerland. He graduated from the Swiss Federal Institute of Technology (ETHZ, Zurich) in 1980 with a PhD in Mathematics and Statistics, where his dissertation was supervised jointly by Frank Hampel, Peter J. Huber, and Hans Föllmer.

== Career and research ==
Buja began working as research associate at ETH Zurich and Children's Hospital, until 1982. In 1982, Buja held his first academic position as an assistant professor at University of Washington, where he later became an associate professor in 1987. He also held positions in industry as a member of technical staff at Bell Communications Research and AT&T Bell Laboratories between 1994–1996 and 1996–Jan 2002, respectively. Then, he returned to academia as a professor at The Wharton School, University of Pennsylvania, where he was designated as the Liem Sioe Liong/First Pacific Company Professor in July 2003.

Buja is a co-author of a data visualization system called XGobi, a predecessor of GGobi, for which Google provides more than 10,000 entries. His research interests include data visualization, data mining, multivariate statistics, and nonparametric statistics. Results of his research have been discussed in multiple articles like : Science Daily, Slate, knowledge@wharton.

== Notable papers ==
Buja has authored several publications. Of which the following papers have more than 500 citations:

- “Linear Smoothers and the Additive Model,” Buja, A., Hastie, T., and Tibshirani, R., The Annals of Statistics, 17, 453–555 (1989).
- “Penalized Discriminant Analysis,” Hastie, T., Buja, A., and Tibshirani, R., The An- nals of Statistics, 23, 73–102 (1995).
- “Flexible Discriminant Analysis,” Hastie, T., Tibshirani, R., and Buja, A., Journal of the American Statistical Association, 89, 1255–1270 (1994).
- “Rare de novo and transmitted copy number variation in autistic spectrum disorders,” Levy, D., Ronemus, M., Yamrom, B., Lee, Y., Leotta, A., Kendall, J., Marks, S., Lakshmi, B., Ye, K., Buja, A., Yoon, S., Krieger, A., Troge, J., Rodgers, L., Iossifov, I., and Wigler M. Neuron, 70 (5) 886–897 (9 June 2011).
- “Remarks on Parallel Analysis,” Buja, A., and Eyuboglu, N., Multivariate Behavioral Research 27, 509–540 (1993).

== Awards ==
- Infovis best paper award for the article “Graphical inference for infovis” by Wickham, H., Cook, D., Hofmann, H., and Buja, A. IEEE Transactions on Visualization and Computer Graphics (Proc. InfoVis’10)., 2010
- Journal of Marketing, finalist for the Harold H. Maynard Award and featured blog article of the October Issue, 2007
- Fellow, Institute of Mathematical Statistics, 2006
- IMS Medallion lecture, Joint Statistical Meetings, New York, 2002
- Fellow, American Statistical Association, 1994
- Award Medal for diploma thesis in mathematics, Swiss Federal Institute of Technology, 1975

== See also ==
- Dianne Cook (statistician)
- Peter J. Huber
- List of fellows of the American Statistical Association
