= Median regression =

Median regression may refer to:

- Quantile regression, a regression analysis used to estimate conditional quantiles such as the median
- Repeated median regression, an algorithm for robust linear regression
