= Peter Rousseeuw =

Belgian statistician (born 1956)

Peter J. Rousseeuw
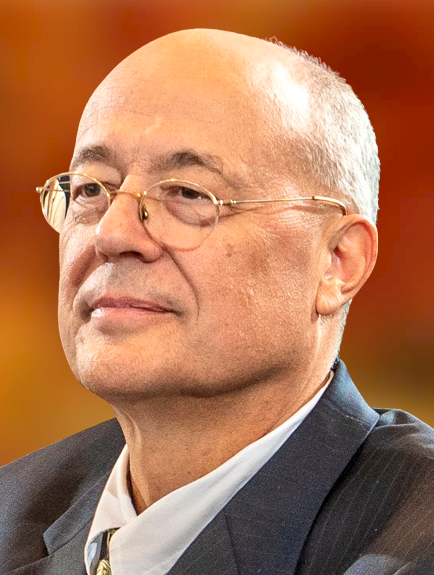
- Peter Rousseeuw in 2022
- Born: 13 October 1956 (age 69); Wilrijk, Belgium
- Education: Vrije Universiteit Brussel; ETH Zurich
- Scientific career
- Fields: Statistics
- Workplaces: Delft University of Technology; University of Fribourg; University of Antwerp; Renaissance Technologies; KU Leuven
- Thesis: New Infinitesimal Methods in Robust Statistics (1981)
- Doctoral advisor: Frank Hampel; Jean Haezendonck
- Doctoral students: Mia Hubert

Peter J. Rousseeuw (born 13 October 1956) is a Belgian statistician known for his work on robust statistics and cluster analysis. He obtained his PhD in 1981 at the Vrije Universiteit Brussel, following research carried out at the ETH in Zurich, which led to a book on influence functions. Later he was professor at the Delft University of Technology, The Netherlands, at the University of Fribourg, Switzerland, and at the University of Antwerp, Belgium. Next he was a senior researcher at Renaissance Technologies. He then returned to Belgium as professor at KU Leuven, until becoming emeritus in 2022. His former PhD students include Annick Leroy, Hendrik Lopuhaä, Geert Molenberghs, Christophe Croux, Mia Hubert, Stefan Van Aelst, Tim Verdonck and Jakob Raymaekers.

== Research ==
Rousseeuw has constructed several frequently used methods. He proposed the Least Trimmed Squares method and S-estimators for robust regression, which can resist outliers in the data. This work led to his book Robust Regression and Outlier Detection with Annick Leroy.

He also introduced the Minimum Volume Ellipsoid and Minimum Covariance Determinant methods for robust scatter matrices.

With Leonard Kaufman he coined the term medoid when proposing the k-medoids method for cluster analysis, also known as Partitioning Around Medoids (PAM). His silhouette display shows the result of a cluster analysis, and the corresponding silhouette coefficient is often used to select the number of clusters. The work on cluster analysis led to a book titled Finding Groups in Data. Rousseeuw was the original developer of the R package cluster along with Mia Hubert and Anja Struyf.

The Rousseeuw–Croux scale estimator $Q_n$ is an efficient alternative to the median absolute deviation (see robust measures of scale).

With Ida Ruts and John Tukey he introduced the bagplot, a bivariate generalization of the boxplot.

His more recent work has focused on concepts and algorithms for statistical depth functions in the settings of multivariate, regression and functional data, and on robust principal component analysis. His current research is on visualization of classification and cellwise outliers. For more information see a 2024 interview.

== Recognition ==
Rousseeuw was elected Member of International Statistical Institute (1991), Fellow of Institute of Mathematical Statistics (1993), and Fellow of the American Statistical Association (1994). His 1984 paper on robust regression has been reprinted in Breakthroughs in Statistics, which collected and annotated the 60 most influential papers in statistics from 1890 to 1990. He became an ISI highly cited researcher in 2003, and was awarded the Jack Youden Prize (2018, 2022) and the Frank Wilcoxon Prize (2021), the George Box Medal, and the Research Medal of the International Federation of Classification Societies. In 2024, he received the Gottfried E. Noether Distinguished Scholar Award of the American Statistical Association.

== Rousseeuw Prize for Statistics ==
From 2016 onward, Peter Rousseeuw worked on creating a new biennial prize, sponsored by him. The goal of the prize is to recognize outstanding statistical innovations with impact on society, and to promote awareness of the important role and intellectual content of statistics and its profound impact on human endeavors. The award amount is 1 million US dollars, similar to the Nobel Prize in other fields. The first award was presented in 2022.
