= Robust regression =

Specialized form of regression analysis, in statistics

In robust statistics, robust regression seeks to overcome some limitations of traditional regression analysis. A regression analysis models the relationship between one or more independent variables and a dependent variable. Standard types of regression, such as ordinary least squares, have favourable properties if their underlying assumptions are true, but can give misleading results otherwise (i.e. are not robust to assumption violations). Robust regression methods are designed to limit the effect that violations of assumptions by the underlying data-generating process have on regression estimates.

For example, least squares estimates for regression models are highly sensitive to outliers: an outlier with twice the error magnitude of a typical observation contributes four (two squared) times as much to the squared error loss, and therefore has more leverage over the regression estimates. The Huber loss function is a robust alternative to standard square error loss that reduces outliers' contributions to the squared error loss, thereby limiting their impact on regression estimates.

== Applications ==
=== Heteroscedastic errors ===
One instance in which robust estimation should be considered is when there is a strong suspicion of heteroscedasticity. In the homoscedastic model, it is assumed that the variance of the error term is constant for all values of x. Heteroscedasticity allows the variance to be dependent on x, which is more accurate for many real scenarios. For example, the variance of expenditure is often larger for individuals with higher income than for individuals with lower incomes. Software packages usually default to a homoscedastic model, even though such a model may be less accurate than a heteroscedastic model. One simple approach (Tofallis, 2008) is to apply least squares to percentage errors, as this reduces the influence of the larger values of the dependent variable compared to ordinary least squares.

=== Presence of outliers ===
Another common situation in which robust estimation is used occurs when the data contain outliers. In the presence of outliers that do not come from the same data-generating process as the rest of the data, least squares estimation is inefficient and can be biased. Because the least squares predictions are dragged towards the outliers, and because the variance of the estimates is artificially inflated, the result is that outliers can be masked. (In many situations, including some areas of geostatistics and medical statistics, it is precisely the outliers that are of interest.)

Although it is sometimes claimed that least squares (or classical statistical methods in general) are robust, they are only robust in the sense that the type I error rate does not increase under violations of the model. In fact, the type I error rate tends to be lower than the nominal level when outliers are present, and there is often a dramatic increase in the type II error rate. The reduction of the type I error rate has been labelled as the conservatism of classical methods.

== History and unpopularity of robust regression ==
Despite their superior performance over least squares estimation in many situations, robust methods for regression are still not widely used. Several reasons may help explain their unpopularity (Hampel et al. 1986, 2005). One possible reason is that there are several competing methods and the field got off to many false starts. Also, robust estimates are much more computationally intensive than least squares estimation; in recent years, however, this objection has become less relevant, as computing power has increased greatly. Another reason may be that some popular statistical software packages failed to implement the methods (Stromberg, 2004). Perhaps the most important reason for the unpopularity of robust regression methods is that when the error variance is quite large or does not exist, for any given dataset, any estimate of the regression coefficients, robust or otherwise, will likely be practically worthless unless the sample is quite large.

Although uptake of robust methods has been slow, modern mainstream statistics text books often include discussion of these methods (for example, the books by Seber and Lee, and by Faraway; for a good general description of how the various robust regression methods developed from one another see Andersen's book). Also, modern statistical software packages such as R, SAS, Statsmodels, Stata and S-PLUS include considerable functionality for robust estimation (see, for example, the books by Venables and Ripley, and by Maronna et al.).

== Methods for robust regression ==
=== Least squares alternatives ===
The simplest methods of estimating parameters in a regression model that are less sensitive to outliers than the least squares estimates, is to use least absolute deviations. Even then, gross outliers can still have a considerable impact on the model, motivating research into even more robust approaches.

In 1964, Huber introduced M-estimation for regression. The M in M-estimation stands for "maximum likelihood type". The method is robust to outliers in the response variable, but turned out not to be resistant to outliers in the explanatory variables (leverage points). In fact, when there are outliers in the explanatory variables, the method has no advantage over least squares.

In the 1980s, several alternatives to M-estimation were proposed as attempts to overcome the lack of resistance. See the book by Rousseeuw and Leroy for a very practical review. Least trimmed squares (LTS) is a viable alternative and is currently (2007) the preferred choice of Rousseeuw and Ryan (1997, 2008). The Theil–Sen estimator has a lower breakdown point than LTS but is statistically efficient and popular. Another proposed solution was S-estimation. This method finds a line (plane or hyperplane) that minimizes a robust estimate of the scale (from which the method gets the S in its name) of the residuals. This method is highly resistant to leverage points and is robust to outliers in the response. However, this method was also found to be inefficient.

MM-estimation attempts to retain the robustness and resistance of S-estimation, whilst gaining the efficiency of M-estimation. The method proceeds by finding a highly robust and resistant S-estimate that minimizes an M-estimate of the scale of the residuals (the first M in the method's name). The estimated scale is then held constant whilst a close by M-estimate of the parameters is located (the second M).

=== Parametric alternatives ===
Another approach to robust estimation of regression models is to replace the normal distribution with a heavy-tailed distribution. A t-distribution with 4–6 degrees of freedom has been reported to be a good choice in various practical situations. Bayesian robust regression, being fully parametric, relies heavily on such distributions.

Under the assumption of t-distributed residuals, the distribution is a location-scale family. That is, $x \leftarrow (x-\mu)/\sigma$. The degrees of freedom of the t-distribution is sometimes called the kurtosis parameter. Lange, Little and Taylor (1989) discuss this model in some depth from a non-Bayesian point of view. A Bayesian account appears in Gelman et al. (2003).

An alternative parametric approach is to assume that the residuals follow a mixture of normal distributions (Daemi et al. 2019); in particular, a contaminated normal distribution in which the majority of observations are from a specified normal distribution, but a small proportion are from a normal distribution with much higher variance. That is, residuals have probability $1-\varepsilon$ of coming from a normal distribution with variance $\sigma^2$, where $\varepsilon$ is small, and probability $\varepsilon$ of coming from a normal distribution with variance $c\sigma^2$ for some $c > 1$:

$$e_i \sim (1 - \varepsilon) N(0, \sigma^2) + \varepsilon N(0, c\sigma^2).$$

Typically, $\varepsilon < 0.1$. This is sometimes called the $\varepsilon$-contamination model.

Parametric approaches have the advantage that likelihood theory provides an "off-the-shelf" approach to inference (although for mixture models such as the $\varepsilon$-contamination model, the usual regularity conditions might not apply), and it is possible to build simulation models from the fit. However, such parametric models still assume that the underlying model is literally true. As such, they do not account for skewed residual distributions or finite observation precisions.

=== Unit weights ===
Another robust method is the use of unit weights (Wainer & Thissen, 1976), a method that can be applied when there are multiple predictors of a single outcome. Ernest Burgess (1928) used unit weights to predict success on parole. He scored 21 positive factors as present (e.g., "no prior arrest" = 1) or absent ("prior arrest" = 0), then summed to yield a predictor score, which was shown to be a useful predictor of parole success. Samuel S. Wilks (1938) showed that nearly all sets of regression weights sum to composites that are very highly correlated with one another, including unit weights, a result sometimes referred to as Wilks' theorem (Ree, Carretta, & Earles, 1998). Robyn Dawes (1979) examined decision making in applied settings, showing that simple models with unit weights often outperformed human experts. Bobko, Roth, and Buster (2007) reviewed the literature on unit weights and concluded that decades of empirical studies show that unit weights perform similar to ordinary regression weights on cross validation.

== Example: BUPA liver data ==
The BUPA liver data have been studied by various authors, including Breiman (2001). The data can be found at the classic data sets page, and there is some discussion in the article on the Box–Cox transformation. A plot of the logs of ALT versus the logs of γGT appears below. The two regression lines are those estimated by ordinary least squares (OLS) and by robust MM-estimation. The analysis was performed in R using software made available by Venables and Ripley (2002).

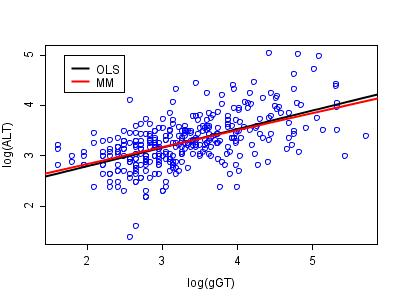

The two regression lines appear to be very similar (and this is not unusual in a data set of this size). However, the advantage of the robust approach comes to light when the estimates of residual scale are considered. For ordinary least squares, the estimate of scale is 0.420, compared to 0.373 for the robust method. Thus, the relative efficiency of ordinary least squares to MM-estimation in this example is 1.266. This inefficiency leads to loss of power in hypothesis tests and to unnecessarily wide confidence intervals on estimated parameters.

=== Outlier detection ===
Another consequence of the inefficiency of the ordinary least squares fit is that several outliers are masked because the estimate of residual scale is inflated; the scaled residuals are pushed closer to zero than when a more appropriate estimate of scale is used. The plots of the scaled residuals from the two models appear below. The variable on the x axis is just the observation number as it appeared in the data set. Rousseeuw and Leroy (1986) contains many such plots.

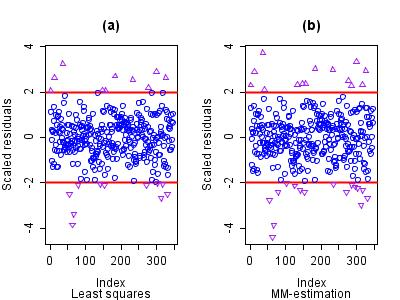

The horizontal reference lines are at 2 and −2, so that any observed scaled residual beyond these boundaries can be considered to be an outlier. Clearly, the least squares method leads to many interesting observations being masked.

Whilst in one or two dimensions outlier detection using classical methods can be performed manually, with large data sets and in high dimensions the problem of masking can make identification of many outliers impossible. Robust methods automatically detect these observations, offering a serious advantage over classical methods when outliers are present.

== See also ==
- Regression
- Iteratively reweighted least squares
- M-estimator
- Relaxed intersection
- RANSAC
- Repeated median regression
- Theil–Sen estimator, a method for robust simple linear regression
