= Mia Hubert =

Belgian mathematical statistician

Mia Hubert is a Belgian mathematical statistician known for her research on topics in robust statistics including medoid-based clustering,^{[a]} regression depth,^{[b]} the medcouple for robustly measuring skewness,^{[c]} box plots for skewed data,^{[f]} and robust principal component analysis,^{[d]} and for her implementations of robust statistical algorithms in the R statistical software system, MATLAB,^{[e]} and S-PLUS.^{[a]} She is a professor in the statistics and data science section of the department of mathematics at KU Leuven.

== Education and career ==
Hubert earned a diploma in mathematics in 1992 from the University of Antwerp, and obtained her Ph.D. in 1997 at the same university. Her dissertation, Robust Regression for Data Analysis, was supervised by Peter Rousseeuw. She joined the KU Leuven faculty in 2001.

She was the original developer of the R package cluster along with Peter Rousseeuw and Anja Struyf.

== Recognition ==
Hubert became an Elected Member of the International Statistical Institute in 2013.

== Selected publications ==
a.	Struyf, Anja; Hubert, Mia; Rousseeuw, Peter (1997), "Clustering in an object-oriented environment", Journal of Statistical Software, 1 (4): 1–30

b.	Rousseeuw, Peter J.; Hubert, Mia (1999), "Regression depth", Journal of the American Statistical Association, 94 (446): 388–433, doi:10.2307/2670155, JSTOR 2670155, MR 1702314

c.	Brys, Guy; Hubert, Mia; Struyf, Anja (2004), "A robust measure of skewness", Journal of Computational and Graphical Statistics, 13 (4): 996–1017, doi:10.1198/106186004X12632, MR 2109062, S2CID 120919149

d.	Hubert, Mia; Rousseeuw, Peter J.; Vanden Branden, Karlien (2005), "ROBPCA: a new approach to robust principal component analysis", Technometrics, 47 (1): 64–79, doi:10.1198/004017004000000563, MR 2135793, S2CID 5071469

e.	Verboven, Sabine; Hubert, Mia (2005), "LIBRA: a MATLAB library for robust analysis", Chemometrics and Intelligent Laboratory Systems, 75 (2), Elsevier {BV}: 127–136, doi:10.1016/j.chemolab.2004.06.003

f.	Hubert, Mia; Vandervieren, Ellen (2008), "An adjusted boxplot for skewed distributions", Computational Statistics & Data Analysis, 52 (12): 5186–5201, doi:10.1016/j.csda.2007.11.008, MR 2526585
