= S-estimator =

The goal of S-estimators is to have a simple high-breakdown regression estimator, which share the flexibility and nice asymptotic properties of M-estimators. The name "S-estimators" was chosen as they are based on estimators of scale.

We will consider estimators of scale defined by a function $\rho$, which satisfy

- R1 – $\rho$ is symmetric, continuously differentiable and $\rho(0)=0$.
- R2 – there exists $c > 0$ such that $\rho$ is strictly increasing on $[c, \infty]$

For any sample $\{r_1, ..., r_n\}$ of real numbers, we define the scale estimate $s(r_1, ..., r_n)$ as the solution of

$\frac{1}{n}\sum_{i=1}^n \rho(r_i/s) = K$,

where $K$ is the expectation value of $\rho$ for a standard normal distribution. (If there are more solutions to the above equation, then we take the one with the smallest solution for s; if there is no solution, then we put $s(r_1, ..., r_n)=0$ .)

Definition:

Let $(x_1, y_1), ..., (x_n, y_n)$ be a sample of regression data with p-dimensional $x_i$. For each vector $\theta$, we obtain residuals $s(r_1(\theta),..., r_n(\theta))$ by solving the equation of scale above, where $\rho$ satisfy R1 and R2. The S-estimator $\hat\theta$ is defined by

$\hat\theta = \min_\theta \, s(r_1(\theta),..., r_n(\theta))$

and the final scale estimator $\hat \sigma$ is then

$\hat\sigma = s(r_1(\hat\theta), ..., r_n(\hat\theta))$.
