= Hans-Rudolf Künsch =

Swiss mathematician and statistician (born 1951)

Hans Rudolf Künsch
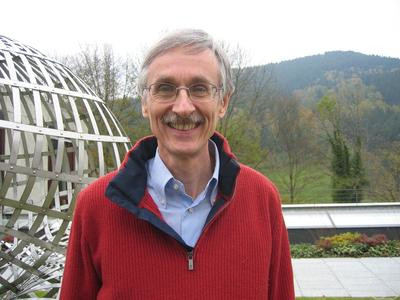
- Born: October 17, 1951 (age 74); Seeberg, Bern, Switzerland
- Education: ETH Zürich
- Scientific career
- Fields: Statistics
- Institutions: ETH Zürich
- Thesis: Reellwertige Zufallsfelder auf einem Gitter: Interpolationsprobleme, Variationsprinzip und statistische Analyse (1980)
- Doctoral advisor: Hans Föllmer; Frank Hampel
- Doctoral students: Peter Bühlmann
- Website: people.math.ethz.ch/~kuensch/

Hans Rudolf Künsch (born October 17, 1951) is a Swiss mathematician and statistician based in Zürich, where he has been a professor with the Seminar für Statistik since 1983 at the ETH Zurich.

== Education and career ==
Künsch studied mathematics at ETH Zürich Künsch worked as a research student at the University of Tokyo with a scholarship grant from the Japanese government. After completing his PhD at ETH Zürich, with a dissertation project under Hans Föllmer and Frank Hampel on Reellwertige Zufallsfelder auf einem Gitter: Interpolationsprobleme, Variationsprinzip und statistische Analyse, he returned to research work in Japan, at the University of Tokyo and the Institute of Statistical Mathematics. Since 1983 he has held various academic positions with his alma mater ETH Zürich.

From 2007 to 2009, Künsch was the Chair of ETH Zürich's Department of Mathematics. He was a co-editor of the leading journal Annals of Statistics during the 1998–2000 period and has served on the Council of the worldwide organisation Institute of Mathematical Statistics. Künsch retired in 2014.

== Research ==
Künsch's main research areas are spatial statistics and random fields (geostatistics, parameter estimation for Gibbs fields, image analysis, space-time models); time series analysis (long range dependence, bootstrap methods for dependent data, general state-space models); and robust statistics and statistical model selection. Among his most frequently cited contributions is the Annals of Statistics 1989 article on bootstrapping and jackknifing in stationary time series.
