= Standard deviation line =

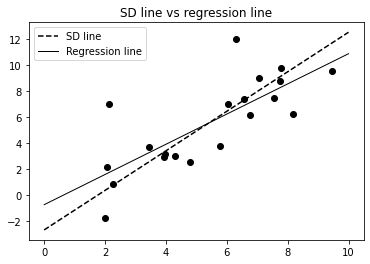
Plot of the standard deviation line (SD line), dashed, and the regression line, solid, for a scatter diagram of 20 points.

In statistics, the standard deviation line (or SD line) marks points on a scatter plot that are an equal number of standard deviations away from the average in each dimension. For example, in a 2-dimensional scatter diagram with variables $x$ and $y$, points that are 1 standard deviation away from the mean of $x$ and also 1 standard deviation away from the mean of $y$ are on the SD line. The SD line is a useful visual tool since points in a scatter diagram tend to cluster around it, more or less tightly depending on their correlation.

== Properties ==
=== Relation to regression line ===
The SD line goes through the point of averages and has a slope of $\frac{\sigma_y}{\sigma_x}$ when the correlation between $x$ and $y$ is positive, and $-\frac{\sigma_y}{\sigma_x}$ when the correlation is negative. Unlike the regression line, the SD line does not take into account the relationship between $x$ and $y$. The slope of the SD line is related to that of the regression line by $a = r \frac{\sigma_y}{\sigma_x}$ where $a$ is the slope of the regression line, $r$ is the correlation coefficient, and $\frac{\sigma_y}{\sigma_x}$ is the magnitude of the slope of the SD line.

=== Typical distance of points to SD line ===
The root mean square vertical distance of points from the SD line is $\sqrt{2(1 - |r|)} \times\sigma_y$. This gives an idea of the spread of points around the SD line.
