= Frank Hampel =

German statistician (1941-2018)

Frank Rudolf Hampel
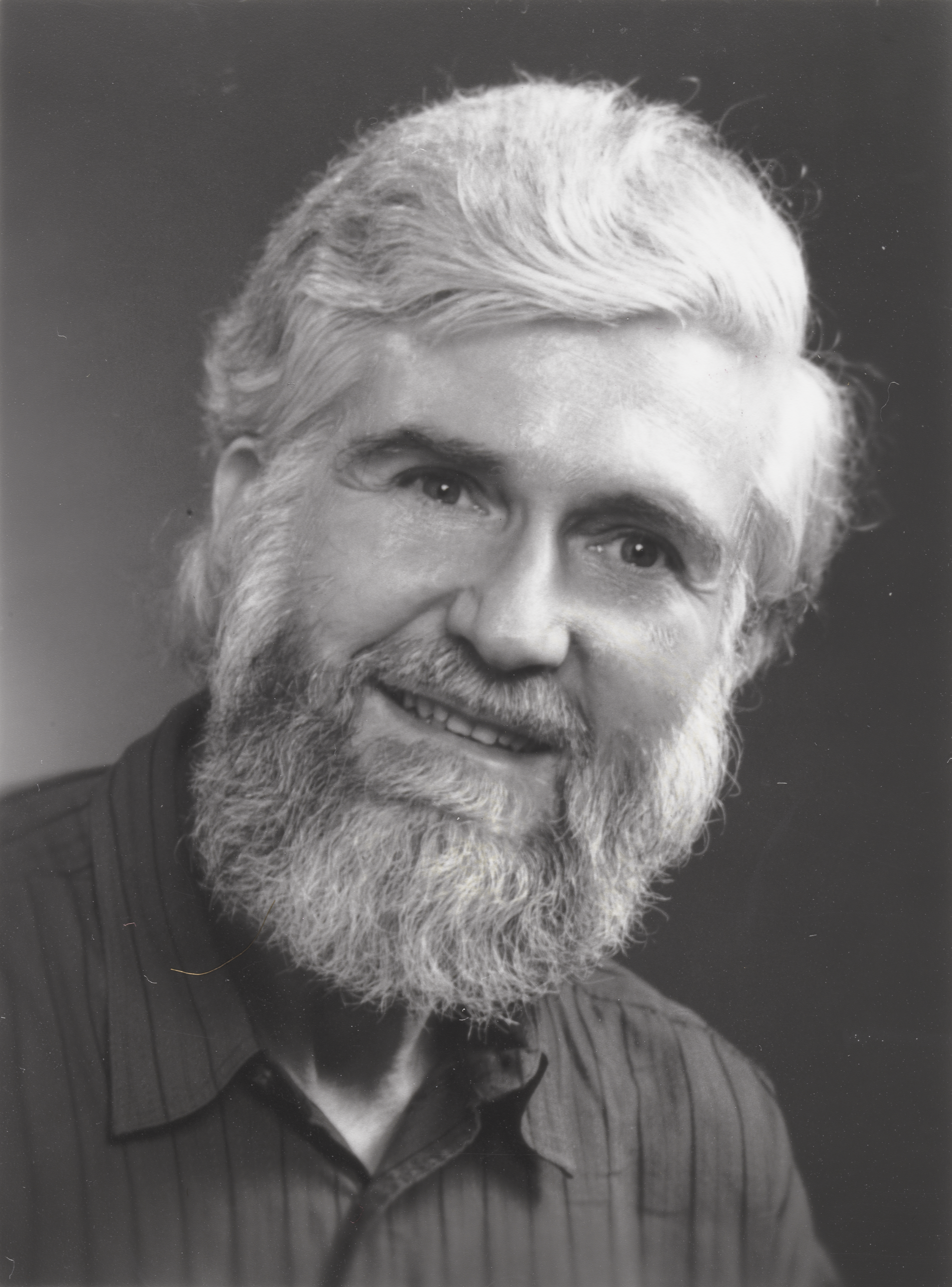
- Hampel in 1997
- Born: 1941; Heidelberg, Germany
- Died: October 2, 2018 (aged 76–77); Thalwil, Switzerland
- Education: University of Göttingen; LMU Munich; University of California, Berkeley
- Known for: influence function
- Scientific career
- Fields: Statistics
- Institutions: ETH Zürich
- Thesis: Contributions to the Theory of Robust Estimation (1968)
- Doctoral advisor: Erich Lehmann
- Doctoral students: Hans-Rudolf Künsch; Peter Rousseeuw; Andreas Buja

Frank Rudolf Hampel (1941 in Heidelberg – October 2, 2018 in Thalwil) was a German statistician and a pioneer in robust statistics. He was professor at ETH Zurich for most of his career.

== Education and career ==
Hampel was born in Heidelberg and studied mathematics and physics at the University of Göttingen and LMU Munich, then statistics at the University of California, Berkeley, where he also completed his doctorate in 1968 under the supervision of Erich Lehmann. He was then responsible for the statistical consulting service at the University of Zurich as senior assistant. In 1973, he was elected associate professor of statistics at ETH Zurich by the Swiss Federal Council, and in 1979 he was promoted to full professor. Under his leadership, the Seminar for Statistics continued to grow until his retirement in 2006.

== Research ==
Hampel made contributions to robust statistics and made a significant contribution to ETH Zurich being a world leader in this field. He introduced the two central terms, breakdown point and influence function with, which quantify the robustness properties of statistical methods and are used to construct optimal inference methods. The application of statistics in the analysis of data was also a major concern for Frank Hampel. In the 1970s he was in charge of the evaluation of the so-called large-scale test IV for hail defense in Switzerland, and he made it possible to set up the statistical consulting service at ETH Zurich. In his free time, Hampel devoted himself to observing nature with commitment. He acquired knowledge of astronomy, birds, orchids and dragonflies.

== Bibliography ==
- Hampel, Frank R.; Ronchetti, Elvezio M.; Rousseeuw, Peter J.; Stahel, Werner A. (2005-03-22). Robust Statistics: The Approach Based on Influence Functions. Wiley Series in Probability and Statistics (1 ed.). Wiley. doi:10.1002/9781118186435. ISBN 978-0-471-73577-9.
- Andrews, David F.; Hampel, Frank R. (2015-03-08). Robust Estimates of Location: Survey and Advances. Princeton University Press. ISBN 978-1-4008-6701-1.

== See also ==
- Peter J. Huber
