= Peter J. Huber =

Swiss statistician (born 1934)

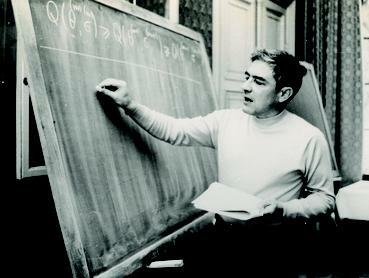
- Peter Huber in 1975
- Born: 25 March 1934 (age 92); Wohlen, Aargau
- Education: ETH Zürich
- Known for: Heteroscedasticity-consistent standard errors
- Scientific career
- Fields: Statistics
- Workplaces: ETH Zürich; Harvard University; Massachusetts Institute of Technology; University of Bayreuth
- Doctoral advisor: Beno Eckmann
- Doctoral students: David Donoho; Emery N. Brown

Peter Jost Huber (born 25 March 1934) is a Swiss statistician. He is known for his contributions to the development of heteroscedasticity-consistent standard errors.

A native of Wohlen, Aargau, Huber earned his Ph.D. at the ETH Zürich in 1962, under the supervision of Beno Eckmann. He later changed his research area from topology to statistics. In 2012, he became one of the inaugural fellows of the American Mathematical Society.

== See also ==
- Huber loss
- M-estimator
- Frank Hampel
