= Least trimmed squares =

Least trimmed squares (LTS), or least trimmed sum of squares, is a robust statistical method that fits a function to a set of data whilst not being unduly affected by the presence of outliers . It is one of a number of methods for robust regression.

== Description of method ==
Instead of the standard least squares method, which minimises the sum of squared residuals over n points, the LTS method attempts to minimise the sum of squared residuals over a subset, $k$, of those points. The unused $n - k$ points do not influence the fit.

In a standard least squares problem, the estimated parameter values β are defined to be those values that minimise the objective function S(β) of squared residuals:

$$S = \sum_{i=1}^n r_i(\beta)^2,$$

where the residuals are defined as the differences between the values of the dependent variables (observations) and the model values:

$$r_i(\beta) = y_i - f(x_i, \beta),$$

and where n is the overall number of data points. For a least trimmed squares analysis, this objective function is replaced by one constructed in the following way. For a fixed value of β, let $r_{(j)}(\beta)$ denote the set of ordered absolute values of the residuals (in increasing order of absolute value). In this notation, the standard sum of squares function is

$$S(\beta) = \sum_{j=1}^n r_{(j)}(\beta)^2,$$

while the objective function for LTS is

$$S_k(\beta) = \sum_{j=1}^k r_{(j)}(\beta)^2.$$

== Computational considerations ==
Because this method is binary, in that points are either included or excluded, no closed-form solution exists. As a result, methods for finding the LTS solution sift through combinations of the data, attempting to find the k subset that yields the lowest sum of squared residuals. Methods exist for low n that will find the exact solution; however, as n rises, the number of combinations grows rapidly, thus yielding methods that attempt to find approximate (but generally sufficient) solutions.
