= Hans Föllmer =

German mathematician

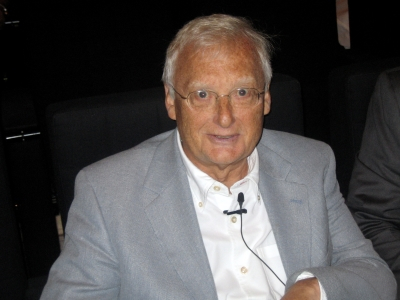
Föllmer in Madrid, 2006

Hans Föllmer (20 May 1941 in Heiligenstadt, Thuringia, Germany) is a German mathematician, currently professor emeritus at the Humboldt University of Berlin, visiting professor at the National University of Singapore, and Andrew D. White Professor-at-Large at Cornell University. He was awarded the Cantor medal in 2006. In 2007 he became doctor honoris causa at the Paris Dauphine University.

Föllmer is widely known for his contributions to probability theory, stochastic analysis and mathematical finance.

In mathematical economics, he made early contributions to the mathematical modeling of social interactions.

In mathematical finance, he made fundamental contributions to the theory of risk measures and the hedging of contingent claims.

The Föllmer process, a stochastic process first considered by Erwin Schrödinger but formulated in the language of stochastic differential equations by Föllmer, is named after him. In mathematical finance, the Föllmer-Schweizer decomposition is named after him and Martin Schweizer.

== Main scientific works ==
Föllmer, Hans (March 1974). "Random economies with many interacting agents". Journal of Mathematical Economics. 1 (1): 51–62. doi:10.1016/0304-4068(74)90035-4. ISSN 0304-4068.

Föllmer, H. (1981). "Calcul d'Ito sans probabilites". Séminaire de Probabilités XV 1979/80. Lecture Notes in Mathematics. Vol. 850. Springer Berlin Heidelberg. pp. 143–150. doi:10.1007/BFb0088364. eISSN 1617-9692. ISBN 978-3-540-10689-0. ISSN 0075-8434.

Föllmer, Hans (1988). "Random fields and diffusion processes". Lecture Notes in Mathematics. Vol. 1362. Springer Berlin Heidelberg. pp. 101–203. doi:10.1007/BFb0086180. eISSN 1617-9692. ISBN 978-3-540-50549-5. ISSN 0075-8434.

Föllmer, Hans; Schied, Alexander (25 July 2016), Stochastic Finance, De Gruyter, doi:10.1515/9783110463453, ISBN 9783110463453

Föllmer, Hans; Schied, Alexander (1 October 2002). "Convex measures of risk and trading constraints". Finance and Stochastics. 6 (4): 429–447. doi:10.1007/s007800200072. hdl:10419/62741. ISSN 0949-2984. S2CID 1729029.

Föllmer, H.; Kabanov, Y.M. (1 November 1997). "Optional decomposition and Lagrange multipliers". Finance and Stochastics. 2 (1): 69–81. doi:10.1007/s007800050033. eISSN 1432-1122. hdl:10419/66314. ISSN 0949-2984. S2CID 13051630.
