= Continuous binomial distribution =

Continuous probability distribution on the unit interval

Continuous binomial (cobin)
- Parameters: $\theta\in\mathbb{R}$ (natural parameter) $\lambda\in\{1,2,3,\dots\}$ (inverse dispersion)
- Support: $x\in[0,1]$ if $\lambda = 1$, $x\in(0,1)$ if $\lambda \ge 2$
- PDF: $f(x;\theta,\lambda)=h(x;\lambda)\exp\!\big(\lambda\theta x-\lambda B(\theta)\big),\quad 0\le x\le 1,$ with $$B(\theta)= \begin{cases} \log\!\left(\frac{e^\theta-1}{\theta}\right), & \theta\ne 0,\\ 0, & \theta=0, \end{cases}$$ and $h(x;\lambda)=\frac{\lambda}{(\lambda-1)!}\sum_{k=0}^{\lambda}(-1)^k{\lambda\choose k}\,\max(0,\lambda x-k)^{\lambda-1}.$
- Mean: $$B'(\theta)= \begin{cases} \frac{e^\theta}{e^\theta-1}-\frac{1}{\theta}, & \theta\ne 0,\\ \frac{1}{2}, & \theta=0, \end{cases}$$
- Variance: $$\frac{1}{\lambda}B''(\theta)= \begin{cases} \frac{1}{\lambda}\left(\frac{1}{\theta^2}-\frac{e^\theta}{(e^\theta-1)^2}\right), & \theta\ne 0,\\ \frac{1}{12\lambda}, & \theta=0. \end{cases}$$

In probability theory and statistics, the continuous binomial distribution (also called the cobin distribution) is a family of continuous probability distributions on the unit interval that belongs to an exponential dispersion family. The name continuous binomial (cobin) was adopted in 2026 in developing generalized linear models for continuous proportional data, as an alternative to beta regression. The special case $\lambda=1$ coincides with the continuous Bernoulli distribution.

== Definition ==
A random variable $X$ is said to follow a continuous binomial (cobin) distribution with natural parameter $\theta$ and inverse dispersion $\lambda\in\{1,2,\dots\}$, written $X\sim\mathrm{cobin}(\theta,\lambda^{-1})$, if it has density on $[0,1]$ given by

$$f(x;\theta,\lambda)=h(x;\lambda)\exp\!\big(\lambda\theta x-\lambda B(\theta)\big),\qquad 0\le x\le 1,$$

where the log-partition function is

$$B(\theta)=
\begin{cases}
\log\!\left(\frac{e^\theta-1}{\theta}\right), & \theta\ne 0,\\
0, & \theta=0,
\end{cases}$$

and the base measure $h(x;\lambda)$ is

$$h(x;\lambda)=\frac{\lambda}{(\lambda-1)!}\sum_{k=0}^{\lambda}(-1)^k{\lambda\choose k}\,\max(0,\lambda x-k)^{\lambda-1},$$

with $h(x;1)=1$. The function $h(x;\lambda)/\lambda$ coincides with the probability density function of the Irwin–Hall distribution with parameter $n=\lambda$, evaluated at $\lambda x$.

When $\lambda$ is fixed, the cobin distribution belongs to a one-parameter natural exponential family in $\theta$.

== Earlier studies ==
The corresponding two-parameter distributional family appeared in earlier statistical literature without the name continuous binomial distribution. For example, Bates (1955) studied the same distribution in the context of modeling time intervals between successive accidents and hypothesis testing against uniformity.

== Related distributions ==
- Continuous Bernoulli distribution: when $\lambda=1$, the cobin distribution reduces to the continuous Bernoulli distribution.
- Bates distribution: when $\theta=0$, the density reduces to $h(x;\lambda)$, corresponding to the distribution of the mean of $\lambda$ independent $\mathrm{Uniform}(0,1)$ random variables (equivalently, a scaled Irwin–Hall distribution or Bates distribution).
- Uniform distribution: when $\lambda=1$ and $\theta=0$, the distribution reduces to the continuous uniform distribution on $[0,1]$.
- If $X_1,\dots,X_\lambda$ are independent and identically distributed continuous Bernoulli random variables with common natural parameter $\theta$, then

$$\bar{X}=\frac{1}{\lambda}\sum_{i=1}^{\lambda} X_i
\sim \mathrm{cobin}(\theta,\lambda^{-1}).$$

== Properties ==
=== Mean and variance ===
The mean and variance of $X\sim\mathrm{cobin}(\theta,\lambda^{-1})$ can be expressed in terms of derivatives of $B(\theta)$:

- $\operatorname{E}(X)=B'(\theta)=\frac{e^\theta}{e^\theta-1}-\frac{1}{\theta}$, for $\theta\ne 0$.
- $\operatorname{Var}(X)=\frac{1}{\lambda}B''(\theta)=\frac{1}{\lambda}\left(\frac{1}{\theta^2}-\frac{e^\theta}{(e^\theta-1)^2}\right)$, for $\theta\ne 0$.

If $\theta=0$, then $\operatorname{E}(X)=\frac{1}{2}$ and $\operatorname{Var}(X)=\frac{1}{12\lambda}$.

=== Sufficient statistic for the mean ===
If $X_1,\ldots,X_n$ are independent and identically distributed continuous binomial random variables with common natural parameter $\theta$ and fixed inverse dispersion parameter $\lambda$, then the sample mean

$$\bar{X}=\frac{1}{n}\sum_{i=1}^{n}X_i$$

is a sufficient statistic for $\theta$.

This is in contrast with the beta distribution: under a mean–precision parameterisation $X_i\sim\mathrm{Beta}(\mu\phi,(1-\mu)\phi)$ with fixed $\phi$, a sufficient statistic for the mean $\mu$ is

$$\sum_{i=1}^{n}\log\!\left(\frac{X_i}{1-X_i}\right),$$

not the sample mean $\bar{X}$.

== Applications ==
The cobin distribution has been proposed as a response distribution for generalized linear models of continuous proportional data, as an alternative to beta regression, including extensions with random effects.
