= John Nelder =

British statistician

John Ashworth Nelder FRS
- Born: 8 October 1924; Brushford, Somerset, England
- Died: 7 August 2010 (aged 85); Luton, Bedfordshire, England
- Citizenship: United Kingdom
- Education: University of Cambridge
- Known for: Generalized linear models, analysis of complex experimental designs, Nelder–Mead algorithm, GLIM, GenStat
- Awards: Fellow of the Royal Society (1976); Guy Medal (Silver, 1977) (Gold, 2005)
- Scientific career
- Fields: Statistics
- Workplaces: National Vegetable Research Station; Rothamsted Experimental Station; Imperial College London

John Ashworth Nelder FRS (8 October 1924 – 7 August 2010) was a British statistician known for his contributions to experimental design, analysis of variance, computational statistics, and statistical theory.

== Contributions ==
Nelder's work was influential in statistics. While leading research at Rothamsted Experimental Station, Nelder developed and supervised the updating of the statistical software packages GLIM and GenStat: Both packages are flexible high-level programming languages that allow statisticians to formulate linear models concisely. GLIM influenced later environments for statistical computing such as S-PLUS and R. Both GLIM and GenStat have powerful facilities for the analysis of variance for block experiments, an area where Nelder made many contributions.

In statistical theory, Nelder proposed the generalized linear model together with Robert Wedderburn. Nelder and Wedderburn formulated generalized linear models as a way of unifying various other statistical models, including linear regression, logistic regression and Poisson regression. They proposed an iteratively reweighted least squares method for maximum likelihood estimation of the model parameters.

In statistical inference, Nelder (along with George Barnard and A. W. F. Edwards) emphasized the importance of the likelihood in data analysis, promoting this "likelihood approach" as an alternative to frequentist and Bayesian statistics.

In response-surface optimization, Nelder and Roger Mead proposed the Nelder–Mead simplex heuristic, widely used in engineering and statistics.

== Biography ==
Born in Brushford, near Dulverton, Somerset, Nelder was educated at Blundell's School and Sidney Sussex College, Cambridge, where he read Mathematics.

Nelder's appointments included Head of the Statistics Section at the National Vegetable Research Station, Wellesbourne, from 1951 to 1968 and head of the Statistics Department at Rothamsted Experimental Station from 1968 to 1984. During his time at Wellesbourne he spent a year (1965–1966) at the Waite Institute in Adelaide, South Australia, where he worked with Graham Wilkinson on Genstat. He held an appointment as visiting professor at Imperial College London from 1972 onwards.

He was responsible, with Max Nicholson and James Ferguson-Lees, for debunking the Hastings Rarities – sightings of a series of rare birds, preserved by a taxidermist and provided with bogus histories.

Nelder died on 7 August 2010 in Luton and Dunstable Hospital, taken there after a fall at home, which was incidental to the cause of death.

== Awards and distinctions ==
Nelder was elected a Fellow of the Royal Society in 1976 and received the Royal Statistical Society's Guy Medal in Gold in 2005. He was also the recipient of the inaugural Karl Pearson Prize of the International Statistical Institute, with Peter McCullagh, "for their monograph Generalized Linear Models (1983)".

As tribute on his eightieth birthday, a festschrift Methods and Models in Statistics: In Honour of Professor John Nelder, FRS was edited by Niall Adams, Martin Crowder, David J Hand & Dave Stephens, Imperial College Press (2004).

The first annual John Nelder memorial lecture was held at Imperial College London, on 8 March 2012, as part of the Mathematics department Colloquium series. The lecture was given by Nelder's long term co-author, Peter McCullagh. An interview with McCullagh, about statistical modelling, includes some reminiscences about Nelder.

== Selected publications ==
- JN and R. W. M. Wedderburn, "Generalized Linear Models", J. R. Statist. Soc. A, 135 (1972) 370–384.
- McCullagh, P. and J.A. Nelder. 1989. Generalized Linear Models. 2nd ed. Chapman & Hall/CRC, Boca Raton, Florida. ISBN 0-412-31760-5
- Lee, Y., J.A. Nelder, and Y. Pawitan. 2006. Generalized Linear Models with Random Effects: Unified Analysis via H-likelihood. Chapman & Hall/CRC, Boca Raton, Florida. ISBN 1-58488-631-5
