= VGLM =

VGLM may refer to:

- Lalmonirhat Airport (ICAO airport code)
- Vector generalized linear model
