= Robert Wedderburn (disambiguation) =

Robert Wedderburn (1762–1835/36) was a British radical.

Robert Wedderburn may also refer to:

- Robert Wedderburn (poet) (died 1553), Scottish poet
- Robert Wedderburn (statistician) (1947–1975), Scottish statistician
