= Fractional model =

In applied statistics, fractional models are, to some extent, related to binary response models. However, instead of estimating the probability of being in one bin of a dichotomous variable, the fractional model typically deals with variables that take on all possible values in the unit interval. One can easily generalize this model to take on values on any other interval by appropriate transformations. Examples range from participation rates in 401(k) plans to television ratings of NBA games.

== Description ==
There have been two approaches to modeling this problem. Even though they both rely on an index that is linear in x_{i} combined with a link function, this is not strictly necessary. The first approach uses a log-odds transformation of y as a linear function of x_{i}, i.e., $\operatorname{logit} y = \log \frac {y}{1-y} = x\beta$. This approach is problematic for two distinct reasons. The y variable can not take on boundary values 1 and 0, and the interpretation of the coefficients is not straightforward. The second approach circumvents these issues by using the logistic regression as a link function. More specifically,

$$\operatorname E[y \lor x] =  \frac {\exp(x\beta)}{1+\exp(x\beta)}$$

It immediately becomes clear that this set up is very similar to the binary logit model, with that difference that the y variable can actually take on values in the unit interval. Many of the estimation techniques for the binary logit model, such as non-linear least squares and quasi-MLE, carry over in a natural way, just like heteroskedasticity adjustments and partial effects calculations.

Extensions to this cross-sectional model have been provided that allow for taking into account important econometric issues, such as endogenous explanatory variables and unobserved heterogeneous effects. Under strict exogeneity assumptions, it is possible to difference out these unobserved effects using panel data techniques, although weaker exogeneity assumptions can also result in consistent estimators. Control function techniques to deal with endogeneity concerns have also been proposed.
