= Robert Wedderburn (statistician) =

Scottish statistician

Robert William Maclagan Wedderburn (1947– June 1975) was a Scottish statistician who worked at the Rothamsted Experimental Station. He was co-developer, with John Nelder, of the generalized linear model methodology, and then expanded this subject to develop the idea of quasi-likelihood.

Wedderburn was born in Edinburgh, where he attended Fettes College, then studied for a degree and a diploma in statistics at the University of Cambridge. He died aged 28 of anaphylactic shock from an insect bite while on a canal holiday.

"His colleagues remember him as someone of engaging diffidence, who would nonetheless hold his own in argument when he was sure he was right (as he usually was)," wrote John Nelder in Wedderburn's obituary.

== Works ==
Wedderburn published a number of papers.

- Comparison of 3 measures of species-diversity. R. A. Kempton and R. W. M. Wedderburn 1978. Biometrics. 34 (1), pp. 25-37.
- Breed and sex-differences in age of appearance of bovine central incisor teeth. A. H. Andrews and R. W. M. Wedderburn 1977. British Veterinary Journal. 133 (6), pp. 543-547.
- Existence and uniqueness of maximum likelihood estimates for certain generalized linear-models. R. W. M. Wedderburn 1976. Biometrika. 63 (1), pp. 27-32.
- The effects of biocidal treatments on metabolism in soil .3. The relationship between soil biovolume, measured by optical microscopy, and the flush of decomposition caused by fumigation. D. S. Jenkinson, D. S. Powlson and R. W. M. Wedderburn 1976. Soil Biology and Biochemistry. 8 (3), pp. 189-202.
- The Woburn Market Garden experiment 1942-1969 I. A history of the experiment, details of the treatments and yields of the crops. A. E. Johnston and R. W. M. Wedderburn 1975. Rothamsted Experimental Station Report. 2, pp. 79-101.
- Langmuir two-surface equation as a model for phosphate adsorption by soils. I. C. R. Holford, R. W. M. Wedderburn and G. E. G. Mattingly 1974. Journal of Soil Science. 25 (2), pp. 242-255.
- Generalized linear-models specified in terms of constraints. R. W. M. Wedderburn 1974. Journal of the Royal Statistical Society, Series B (Statistical Methodology). 36 (3), pp. 449-454.
- Quasi-likelihood functions, generalized linear models, and the Gauss-Newton method. R. W. M. Wedderburn 1974. Biometrika. 61 (3), pp. 439-447.
- Relationship of age to first molar tooth development in a group of cross-bred steers. A. H. Andrews and R. W. M. Wedderburn 1973. British Veterinary Journal. 129 (6), pp. 512-517.
- A method for predicting proportions of affected herds from proportions of affected animals. F. B. Leech and R. W. M. Wedderburn 1972. Epidemiology & Infection. 70 (3), pp. 409-414.
- Generalized linear models J. A. Nelder and R. W. M. Wedderburn 1972. Journal of the Royal Statistical Society, Series A (Statistics in Society). 135 (3), pp. 370-384.
- Genstat: a general statistics program. N. G. Alvey, J. C. Gower, F. B. Lauckner, P. K. Leech, J. A. Nelder, C. E. Rogers, G. J. S. Ross, H. R. Simpson, R. W. M. Wedderburn and G. N. Wilkinson 1970. Rothamsted Experimental Station, Harpenden.
