= Scoring algorithm =

Form of Newton's method used in statistics

Scoring algorithm, also known as Fisher's scoring, is a form of Newton's method used in statistics to solve maximum likelihood equations numerically, named after Ronald Fisher.

== Sketch of derivation ==
Let $Y_1,\ldots,Y_n$ be random variables, independent and identically distributed with twice differentiable p.d.f. $f(y; \theta)$, and we wish to calculate the maximum likelihood estimator (M.L.E.) $\theta^*$ of $\theta$. First, suppose we have a starting point for our algorithm $\theta_0$, and consider a Taylor expansion of the score function, $V(\theta)$, about $\theta_0$:

$$V(\theta) \approx V(\theta_0) - \mathcal{J}(\theta_0)(\theta - \theta_0), \,$$

where

$$\mathcal{J}(\theta_0) = - \sum_{i=1}^n \left. \nabla \nabla^{\top} \right|_{\theta=\theta_0} \log f(Y_i ; \theta)$$

is the observed information matrix at $\theta_0$. Now, setting $\theta = \theta^*$, using that $V(\theta^*) = 0$ and rearranging gives us:

$$\theta^* \approx \theta_{0} + \mathcal{J}^{-1}(\theta_{0})V(\theta_{0}). \,$$

We therefore use the algorithm

$$\theta_{m+1} = \theta_{m} + \mathcal{J}^{-1}(\theta_{m})V(\theta_{m}), \,$$

and under certain regularity conditions, it can be shown that $\theta_m \rightarrow \theta^*$.

== Fisher scoring ==
In practice, $\mathcal{J}(\theta)$ is usually replaced by $\mathcal{I}(\theta)= \mathrm{E}[\mathcal{J}(\theta)]$, the Fisher information, thus giving us the Fisher Scoring Algorithm:

$$\theta_{m+1} = \theta_{m} + \mathcal{I}^{-1}(\theta_{m})V(\theta_{m})$$
..

Under some regularity conditions, if $\theta_m$ is a consistent estimator, then $\theta_{m+1}$ (the correction after a single step) is 'optimal' in the sense that its error distribution is asymptotically identical to that of the true max-likelihood estimate.

== See also ==
- Score (statistics)
- Score test
- Fisher information
