= Statistical data type =

Taxonomy of statistical data elements

In statistics, data can have any of various types. Statistical data types include categorical (e.g. country), directional (angles or directions, e.g. wind measurements), count (a whole number of events), or real intervals (e.g. measures of temperature).

The data type is a fundamental concept in statistics and controls what sorts of probability distributions can logically be used to describe the variable, the permissible operations on the variable, the type of regression analysis used to predict the variable, etc. The concept of data type is similar to the concept of level of measurement, but more specific. For example, count data requires a different distribution (e.g. a Poisson distribution or binomial distribution) than non-negative real-valued data require, but both fall under the same level of measurement (a ratio scale).

Various attempts have been made to produce a taxonomy of levels of measurement. The psychophysicist Stanley Smith Stevens defined nominal, ordinal, interval, and ratio scales. Nominal measurements do not have meaningful rank order among values, and permit any one-to-one transformation. Ordinal measurements have imprecise differences between consecutive values, but have a meaningful order to those values, and permit any order-preserving transformation. Interval measurements have meaningful distances between measurements defined, but the zero value is arbitrary (as in the case with longitude and temperature measurements in degree Celsius or degree Fahrenheit), and permit any linear transformation. Ratio measurements have both a meaningful zero value and the distances between different measurements defined, and permit any rescaling transformation.

Because variables conforming only to nominal or ordinal measurements cannot be reasonably measured numerically, sometimes they are grouped together as categorical variables, whereas ratio and interval measurements are grouped together as quantitative variables, which can be either discrete or continuous, due to their numerical nature. Such distinctions can often be loosely correlated with data type in computer science, in that dichotomous categorical variables may be represented with the Boolean data type, polytomous categorical variables with arbitrarily assigned integers in the integral data type, and continuous variables with the real data type involving floating point computation. But the mapping of computer science data types to statistical data types depends on which categorization of the latter is being implemented.

Other categorizations have been proposed. For example, Mosteller and Tukey (1977) distinguished grades, ranks, counted fractions, counts, amounts, and balances. Nelder (1990) described continuous counts, continuous ratios, count ratios, and categorical modes of data. See also Chrisman (1998), van den Berg (1991).

The issue of whether or not it is appropriate to apply different kinds of statistical methods to data obtained from different kinds of measurement procedures is complicated by issues concerning the transformation of variables and the precise interpretation of research questions. "The relationship between the data and what they describe merely reflects the fact that certain kinds of statistical statements may have truth values which are not invariant under some transformations. Whether or not a transformation is sensible to contemplate depends on the question one is trying to answer" (Hand, 2004, p. 82).

== Simple data types ==
The following table classifies the various simple data types, associated distributions, permissible operations, etc. Regardless of the logical possible values, all of these data types are generally coded using real numbers, because the theory of random variables often explicitly assumes that they hold real numbers.

| Data Type | Possible values | Example usage | Level of measurement | Common Distributions | Scale of relative differences | Permissible statistics | Common model |
|---|---|---|---|---|---|---|---|
| binary | 0, 1 (arbitrary labels) | Binary outcome ("yes/no", "true/false", "success/failure", etc.) | nominal scale | Bernoulli | incomparable | mode, chi-squared | logistic, probit |
| categorical | "name1", "name2", "name3", ... "nameK" (arbitrary labels) | Categorical outcome with names or places like "Rome", "Amsterdam", "Madrid", "London", "Washington" (specific blood type, political party, word, etc.) | nominal scale | categorical | incomparable | mode, chi-squared | multinomial logit, multinomial probit |
| ordinal | Ordering categories or integer or real number (arbitrary scale) | Ordering adjectives like "Small", "Medium", "Large", relative score, significant only for creating a ranking | ordinal scale | categorical | relative comparison | | ordinal regression (ordered logit, ordered probit) |
| binomial | 0, 1, ..., N | Number of successes (e.g. yes votes) out of N possible | interval scale | binomial, beta-binomial | additive | mean, median, mode, standard deviation, correlation | binomial regression (logistic, probit) |
| real-valued additive | real number | Temperature in degrees (Celsius or Fahrenheit), relative distance, location parameter, etc. (or approximately, anything not varying over a large scale) | interval scale | normal, etc. (usually symmetric about the mean) | additive | mean, median, mode, standard deviation, correlation | standard linear regression |
| count | nonnegative integers (0, 1, ...) | Number of items (telephone calls, people, molecules, births, deaths, etc.) in given interval/area/volume | ratio scale | Poisson, negative binomial | multiplicative | All statistics permitted for interval scales plus the following: geometric mean, harmonic mean, coefficient of variation | Poisson, negative binomial regression |
| real-valued multiplicative | positive real number | Temperature in kelvin, price, income, size, scale parameter, etc. (especially when varying over a large scale) | ratio scale | log-normal, gamma, exponential, etc. (usually a skewed distribution) | multiplicative | All statistics permitted for interval scales plus the following: geometric mean, harmonic mean, coefficient of variation | generalized linear model with logarithmic link |

== Multivariate data types ==
Data that cannot be described using a single number are often shoehorned into random vectors of real-valued random variables, although there is an increasing tendency to treat them on their own. Some examples:

Random vectors
The individual elements may or may not be correlated. Examples of distributions used to describe correlated random vectors are the multivariate normal distribution and multivariate t-distribution. In general, there may be arbitrary correlations between any elements and any others; however, this often becomes unmanageable above a certain size, requiring further restrictions on the correlated elements.
Random matrices
Random matrices can be laid out linearly and treated as random vectors; however, this may not be an efficient way of representing the correlations between different elements. Some probability distributions are specifically designed for random matrices, e.g. the matrix normal distribution and Wishart distribution.
Random sequences
These are sometimes considered to be the same as random vectors, but in other cases the term is applied specifically to cases where each random variable is only correlated with nearby variables (as in a Markov model). This is a particular case of a Bayes network and often used for very long sequences, e.g. gene sequences or lengthy text documents. A number of models are specifically designed for such sequences, e.g. hidden Markov models.
Random processes
These are similar to random sequences, but where the length of the sequence is indefinite or infinite and the elements in the sequence are processed one-by-one. This is often used for data that can be described as a time series, e.g. the price of a stock on successive days. Random processes are also used to model values that vary continuously (e.g. the temperature at successive moments in time), rather than at discrete intervals.
Bayes networks
These correspond to aggregates of random variables described using graphical models, where individual random variables are linked in a graph structure with conditional distributions relating variables to nearby variables.

Multilevel models
are subclasses of Bayes networks that can be thought of as having multiple levels of linear regression.
Random trees
These are a subclass of Bayes network, where the variables are linked in a tree structure. An example is the problem of parsing a sentence, when statistical parsing techniques are used, such as probabilistic context-free grammars (PCFG's).

Random fields
These represent the extension of random processes to multiple dimensions, and are common in physics, where they are used in statistical mechanics to describe properties such as force or electric field that can vary continuously over three dimensions (or four dimensions, when time is included).

These concepts originate in various scientific fields and frequently overlap in usage. As a result, it is very often the case that multiple concepts could potentially be applied to the same problem.

== Comparison with programming data types ==
Most data types in statistics have corresponding types in computer programming, and vice versa, as shown in the following table:

| Statistics | Programming |
|---|---|
| real-valued (interval scale) | floating-point |
| real-valued (ratio scale) | floating-point |
| count data (usually non-negative) | integer |
| binary data | Boolean |
| categorical data | enumerated type |
| random vector | list or array |
| random matrix | two-dimensional array |
| random tree | tree |
