= Variable analysis =

Variable analysis may refer to:

- Bivariate analysis
- Multivariate analysis
- Univariate analysis
