= Univariate (statistics) =

Type of data measuring one attribute

Univariate is a term commonly used in statistics to describe a type of data which consists of observations on only a single characteristic or attribute. A simple example of univariate data would be the salaries of workers in industry. Similar to other data, univariate data can be visualized using graphs, images, or other analysis tools after the data are measured, collected, reported, and analyzed.

== Data types ==
Univariate data can either consist of non-numerical observations (such as eye colors like brown or blue) or numbers (such as a height of 1.65 m or a mass of 70 kg). Generally, the terms categorical univariate data and numerical univariate data are used to distinguish between these types.

=== Categorical univariate data ===
Categorical univariate data consists of non-numerical observations that may be placed in categories. It includes labels or names used to identify an attribute of each element. Categorical univariate data usually use either the nominal or ordinal scale of measurement.

=== Numerical univariate data ===
Numerical univariate data consists of observations that are numbers. They are obtained using either the interval or ratio scale of measurement. This type of univariate data can be classified even further into two subcategories: discrete and continuous. Numerical univariate data is discrete if the set of all possible values is finite or countably infinite. Discrete univariate data is usually associated with counting (such as the number of books read by a person). Numerical univariate data is continuous if the set of all possible values is an interval of numbers. Continuous univariate data is typically associated with measuring (such as the weights of people).

== Data analysis and applications ==
Univariate analysis is the simplest form of analyzing data. Uni means "one", so the data has only one variable (univariate). Univariate data requires analyzing each variable separately. Data is gathered for the purpose of answering a question, or more specifically, a research question. Univariate data does not answer research questions about relationships between variables. Instead, it is used to describe one characteristic or attribute that varies from observation to observation. Typically, there are two purposes that a researcher can look for. The first is to answer a research question with descriptive study and the second is to get knowledge about how attributes vary with an individual effect of a variable in regression analysis. There are some ways to describe patterns found in univariate data, which include graphical methods, measures of central tendency, and measures of variability.

Like other forms of statistics, it can be inferential or descriptive.

Univariate analysis can yield misleading results in cases in which multivariate analysis is more appropriate.

=== Measures of central tendency ===
Central tendency is one of the most common numerical descriptive measures. It is used to estimate the central location of the univariate data by the calculation of mean, median, and mode. Each of these calculations has its own advantages and limitations. The mean has the advantage that its calculation includes each value of the data set, but it is particularly susceptible to the influence of outliers. The median is a better measure when the data set contains outliers. The mode is simple to locate.

If the data being analyzed are categorical, then the only measure of central tendency that can be used is the mode. However, if the data is numerical in nature (ordinal or interval/ratio) then the mode, median, or mean can all be used to describe the data. Using more than one of these measures provides a more accurate descriptive summary of central tendency for the univariate.

=== Measures of variability ===
A measure of variability or dispersion (deviation from the mean) of a univariate data set can reveal the shape of a univariate data distribution more sufficiently. It will provide some information about the variation among data values. The measures of variability together with the measures of central tendency give a better understanding of the data than the measures of central tendency alone. The three most frequently used measures of variability are range, variance, and standard deviation. The appropriateness of each measure would depend on the type of data, the shape of the distribution of data, and which measure of central tendency is being used. If the data is categorical, then there is no measure of variability to report. For data that is numerical, all three measures are possible. If the distribution of data is symmetrical, then the measures of variability are usually the variance and standard deviation. However, if the data are skewed, then the appropriate measure of variability for that data set is the range.

=== Descriptive methods ===
Descriptive statistics describe a sample or population. They can be part of exploratory data analysis.

The appropriate statistic depends on the level of measurement. For nominal variables, a frequency table and a listing of the mode(s) are sufficient. For ordinal variables (Ordinal data), the median can be calculated as a measure of central tendency and the range (and variations of it) as a measure of dispersion. For interval-level variables, the arithmetic mean (average) and standard deviation are added, and for ratio-level variables, the geometric mean and harmonic mean are added, as measures of central tendency, and the coefficient of variation as a measure of dispersion.

For interval and ratio level data, further descriptors include the variable's skewness and kurtosis.

=== Inferential methods ===
Inferential methods allow information to be inferred from a sample to a population. For a nominal variable, a one-way chi-square (goodness of fit) test can help determine if the sample matches that of some population. For interval and ratio level data, a one-sample t-test can infer whether the mean in the sample matches some proposed number (typically 0). Other available tests of location include the one-sample sign test and Wilcoxon signed rank test.

== Graphical methods ==
A barplot

A histogram

A pie chart

Frequently used graphical illustrations for univariate data include:

=== Frequency distribution tables ===
Frequency is how many times a number occurs. The frequency of an observation in statistics indicates the number of times the observation occurs in the data. For example, in the following list of numbers {1, 2, 3, 4, 6, 9, 9, 8, 5, 1, 1, 9, 9, 0, 6, 9}, the frequency of the number 9 is 5 (because it occurs 5 times in this data set).

=== Bar charts ===
A bar chart is a graph consisting of rectangular bars. These bars represent the number or percentage of observations of existing categories in a variable. The length or height of bars gives a visual representation of the proportional differences among categories.

=== Histograms ===
Histograms are used to estimate the distribution of the data, with the frequency of values assigned to a value range called a bin.

=== Pie charts ===
A pie chart is a circle divided into portions that represent the relative frequencies or percentages of a population or a sample belonging to different categories.

== Distributions ==
Univariate distribution is a dispersal type for a single random variable described either with a probability mass function (pmf) for discrete probability distribution, or probability density function (pdf) for continuous probability distribution. It is not to be confused with multivariate distribution.

=== Common discrete distributions ===
- Uniform distribution (discrete)
- Bernoulli distribution
- Binomial distribution
- Geometric distribution
- Negative binomial distribution
- Poisson distribution
- Hypergeometric distribution
- Zeta distribution

=== Common continuous distributions ===
- Uniform distribution (continuous)
- Normal distribution
- Gamma distribution
- Exponential distribution
- Weibull distribution
- Cauchy distribution
- Beta distribution

== See also ==
- Univariate
- Univariate distribution
- Bivariate analysis
- Multivariate analysis
- List of probability distributions
