= Value system (disambiguation) =

Value system may refer to:

- Value system - social scientific concept - meaning the set of cultural and moral values a person or a group has.
- 'Value system' in mathematics, which means a set of interrelated values.
- 'Value system' an extension of the value chain concept.
