= Level of measurement =

Distinction between nominal, ordinal, interval and ratio variables

Level of measurement or scale of measure is a classification that describes the nature of information within the values assigned to variables. Psychologist Stanley Smith Stevens developed the best-known classification with four levels, or scales, of measurement: nominal, ordinal, interval, and ratio. This framework of distinguishing levels of measurement originated in psychology and has since had a complex history, being adopted and extended in some disciplines and by some scholars, and criticized or rejected by others. Other classifications include those by Mosteller and Tukey, and by Chrisman.

Stevens proposed his typology in a 1946 Science article titled "On the theory of scales of measurement". In that article, Stevens claimed that all measurement in science was conducted using four different types of scales that he called "nominal", "ordinal", "interval", and "ratio", unifying both "qualitative" (which are described by his "nominal" type) and "quantitative" (to a different degree, all the rest of his scales). The concept of scale types later received the mathematical rigour that it lacked at its inception with the work of mathematical psychologists Theodore Alper (1985, 1987), Louis Narens (1981a, b), and R. Duncan Luce (1986, 1987, 2001). As Luce (1997, p. 395) wrote:

S. S. Stevens (1946, 1951, 1975) claimed that what counted was having an interval or ratio scale. Subsequent research has given meaning to this assertion, but given his attempts to invoke scale type ideas it is doubtful if he understood it himself ... no measurement theorist I know accepts Stevens's broad definition of measurement... [emphasis added] in our view, the only sensible meaning for 'rule' is empirically testable laws about the attribute.

== Stevens's typology ==
=== Nominal scale ===
A nominal scale consists only of a number of distinct classes or categories, for example: [Cat, Dog, Rabbit]. Unlike the other scales, no kind of relationship between the classes can be relied upon. Thus measuring with the nominal scale is equivalent to classifying.

Nominal measurement may differentiate between items or subjects based only on their names or (meta-)categories and other qualitative classifications they belong to. Thus it has been argued that even dichotomous data relies on a constructivist epistemology. In this case, discovery of an exception to a classification can be viewed as progress.

Numbers may be used to represent the variables but the numbers do not have numerical value or relationship: for example, a globally unique identifier.

Examples of these classifications include gender, nationality, ethnicity, language, genre, style, biological species, and form. In a university one could also use residence hall or department affiliation as examples. Other concrete examples are

- in grammar, the parts of speech: noun, verb, preposition, article, pronoun, etc.
- in politics, power projection: hard power, soft power, etc.
- in software engineering, type of fault: specification faults, design faults, and code faults

Nominal scales were often called qualitative scales, and measurements made on qualitative scales were called qualitative data. However, the rise of qualitative research has made this usage confusing. If numbers are assigned as labels in nominal measurement, they have no specific numerical value or meaning. No form of arithmetic computation (+, −, ×, etc.) may be performed on nominal measures.

==== Mathematical operations ====
Equality and other operations that can be defined in terms of equality, such as inequality and set membership, are the only non-trivial operations that generically apply to objects of the nominal type.

==== Central tendency ====
The mode, i.e. the most common item, is allowed as the measure of central tendency for the nominal type.

=== Ordinal scale ===
The ordinal type allows for rank order (1st, 2nd, 3rd, etc.) by which data can be sorted but still does not allow for a relative degree of difference between them. Examples include, on one hand, dichotomous data with dichotomous (or dichotomized) values such as "sick" vs. "healthy" when measuring health, "guilty" vs. "not-guilty" when making judgments in courts, "wrong/false" vs. "right/true" when measuring truth value, and, on the other hand, non-dichotomous data consisting of a spectrum of values, such as "completely agree", "mostly agree", "mostly disagree", "completely disagree" when measuring opinion.

The ordinal scale places events in order, but there is no attempt to make the intervals of the scale equal in terms of some rule. Rank orders represent ordinal scales and are frequently used in research relating to qualitative phenomena. A student's rank in his graduation class involves the use of an ordinal scale. One has to be very careful in making a statement about scores based on ordinal scales. For instance, if Devi's position in his class is 10th and Ganga's position is 40th, it cannot be said that Devi's position is four times as good as that of Ganga. Ordinal scales only permit the ranking of items from highest to lowest. Ordinal measures have no absolute values, and the real differences between adjacent ranks may not be equal. All that can be said is that one person is higher or lower on the scale than another, but more precise comparisons cannot be made. Thus, the use of an ordinal scale implies a statement of "greater than" or "less than" (an equality statement is also acceptable) without our being able to state how much greater or less. The real difference between ranks 1 and 2, for instance, may be more or less than the difference between ranks 5 and 6.

==== Central tendency and dispersion ====
According to Stevens, for ordinal data, the appropriate measure of central tendency is the median (the mode is also allowed, but not the mean), and the appropriate measure of dispersion is percentile or quartile (the standard deviation is not allowed). Those restrictions would imply that correlations can only be evaluated using rank order methods, and statistical significance can only be evaluated using non-parametric methods (R. M. Kothari, 2004). But the restrictions have not been generally endorsed by statisticians.

In 1946, Stevens observed that psychological measurement, such as measurement of opinions, usually operates on ordinal scales; thus means and standard deviations have no validity according to his rules, but they can be used to get ideas for how to improve operationalization of variables used in questionnaires. Indeed, most psychological data collected by psychometric instruments and tests, measuring cognitive and other abilities, are ordinal (Cliff, 1996; Cliff & Keats, 2003; Michell, 2008). In particular, IQ scores reflect an ordinal scale, in which all scores are meaningful for comparison only. There is no zero point that represents an absence of intelligence, and a 10-point difference may carry different meanings at different points of the scale.

=== Interval scale ===
The interval type allows for defining the degree of difference between measurements, but not the ratio between measurements. Examples include temperature scales with the Celsius scale, date when measured from an arbitrary epoch (such as AD), location in Cartesian coordinates, and direction measured in degrees from true or magnetic north. Ratios are not meaningful since 20 °C cannot be said to be "twice as hot" as 10 °C, nor can multiplication/division be carried out between any two dates directly. However, ratios of differences can be expressed; for example, one difference can be twice another; for example, the ten-degree difference between 15 °C and 25 °C is twice the five-degree difference between 17 °C and 22 °C.

==== Central tendency and dispersion ====
According to Stevens, the mode, median, and arithmetic mean are allowed to measure central tendency of interval variables, while measures of statistical dispersion include range and standard deviation. Since one can only divide by differences, one cannot define measures that require some ratios, such as the coefficient of variation. More subtly, while one can define moments about the origin, only central moments are meaningful, since the choice of origin is arbitrary. One can define standardized moments, since ratios of differences are meaningful, but one cannot define the coefficient of variation, since the mean is a moment about the origin, unlike the standard deviation, which is (the square root of) a central moment.

=== Ratio scale ===
See also: Positive real numbers § Ratio scale

The ratio type takes its name from the fact that measurement is the estimation of the ratio between a magnitude of a continuous quantity and a unit of measurement of the same kind (Michell, 1997, 1999). Most measurement in the physical sciences and engineering is done on ratio scales. Examples include mass, length, duration, plane angle, energy and electric charge. In contrast to interval scales, ratios can be compared using division. Ratio scales are often used to express an order of magnitude such as for temperature in Orders of magnitude (temperature).

==== Central tendency and dispersion ====
According to Stevens, the geometric mean and the harmonic mean are allowed to measure the central tendency, in addition to the mode, median, and arithmetic mean. The studentized range and the coefficient of variation are allowed to measure statistical dispersion. All statistical measures are allowed because all necessary mathematical operations are defined for the ratio scale.

== Debate over Stevens's typology ==
While Stevens's typology is widely adopted, it is still being challenged by other theoreticians, particularly in the cases of the nominal and ordinal types (Michell, 1986). Duncan (1986), for example, objected to the use of the word measurement in relation to the nominal type and Luce (1997) disagreed with Stevens's definition of measurement.

On the other hand, Stevens (1975) said of his own definition of measurement that "the assignment can be any consistent rule. The only rule not allowed would be random assignment, for randomness amounts in effect to a nonrule". Hand says, "Basic psychology texts often begin with Stevens's framework and the ideas are ubiquitous. Indeed, the essential soundness of his hierarchy has been established for representational measurement by mathematicians, determining the invariance properties of mappings from empirical systems to real number continua. Certainly the ideas have been revised, extended, and elaborated, but the remarkable thing is his insight given the relatively limited formal apparatus available to him and how many decades have passed since he coined them."

The use of the mean as a measure of the central tendency for the ordinal type is still debatable among those who accept Stevens's typology. Many behavioural scientists use the mean for ordinal data anyway. This is often justified on the basis that the ordinal type in behavioural science is in fact somewhere between the true ordinal and interval types; although the interval difference between two ordinal ranks is not constant, it is often of the same order of magnitude.

For example, applications of measurement models in educational contexts often indicate that total scores have a fairly linear relationship with measurements across the range of an assessment. Thus, some argue that so long as the unknown interval difference between ordinal scale ranks is not too variable, interval scale statistics such as means can meaningfully be used on ordinal scale variables. Statistical analysis software such as SPSS requires the user to select the appropriate measurement class for each variable. This ensures that subsequent user errors cannot inadvertently perform meaningless analyses (for example correlation analysis with a variable on a nominal level).

L. L. Thurstone made progress toward developing a justification for obtaining the interval type, based on the law of comparative judgment. A common application of the law is the analytic hierarchy process. Further progress was made by Georg Rasch (1960), who developed the probabilistic Rasch model that provides a theoretical basis and justification for obtaining interval-level measurements from counts of observations such as total scores on assessments.

=== Other proposed typologies ===
Typologies aside from Stevens's typology have been proposed. For instance, Mosteller and Tukey (1977) and Nelder (1990) described continuous counts, continuous ratios, count ratios, and categorical modes of data. See also Chrisman (1998), van den Berg (1991).

==== Mosteller and Tukey's typology (1977) ====
Mosteller and Tukey noted that the four levels are not exhaustive and proposed seven instead:

1. Names
2. Grades (ordered labels like beginner, intermediate, advanced)
3. Ranks (orders with 1 being the smallest or largest, 2 the next smallest or largest, and so on)
4. Counted fractions (bound by 0 and 1)
5. Counts (non-negative integers)
6. Amounts (non-negative real numbers)
7. Balances (any real number)

For example, percentages (a variation on fractions in the Mosteller–Tukey framework) do not fit well into Stevens's framework: No transformation is fully admissible.

==== Chrisman's typology (1998) ====
Nicholas R. Chrisman introduced an expanded list of levels of measurement to account for various measurements that do not necessarily fit with the traditional notions of levels of measurement. Measurements bound to a range and repeating (like degrees in a circle, clock time, etc.), graded membership categories, and other types of measurement do not fit to Stevens's original work, leading to the introduction of six new levels of measurement, for a total of ten:

1. Nominal
2. Gradation of membership
3. Ordinal
4. Interval
5. Log-interval
6. Extensive ratio
7. Cyclical ratio
8. Derived ratio
9. Counts
10. Absolute

While some claim that the extended levels of measurement are rarely used outside of academic geography, graded membership is central to fuzzy set theory, while absolute measurements include probabilities and the plausibility and ignorance in Dempster–Shafer theory. Cyclical ratio measurements include angles and times. Counts appear to be ratio measurements, but the scale is not arbitrary and fractional counts are commonly meaningless. Log-interval measurements are commonly displayed in stock market graphics. All these types of measurements are commonly used outside academic geography, and do not fit well to Stevens's original work.

=== Scale types and Stevens's "operational theory of measurement" ===
The theory of scale types is the intellectual handmaiden to Stevens's "operational theory of measurement", which was to become definitive within psychology and the behavioral sciences, despite Michell's characterization as its being quite at odds with measurement in the natural sciences (Michell, 1999). Essentially, the operational theory of measurement was a reaction to the conclusions of a committee established in 1932 by the British Association for the Advancement of Science to investigate the possibility of genuine scientific measurement in the psychological and behavioral sciences. This committee, which became known as the Ferguson committee, published a Final Report (Ferguson, et al., 1940, p. 245) in which Stevens's sone scale (Stevens & Davis, 1938) was an object of criticism:

…any law purporting to express a quantitative relation between sensation intensity and stimulus intensity is not merely false but is in fact meaningless unless and until a meaning can be given to the concept of addition as applied to sensation.

That is, if Stevens's sone scale genuinely measured the intensity of auditory sensations, then evidence for such sensations as being quantitative attributes needed to be produced. The evidence needed was the presence of additive structure—a concept comprehensively treated by the German mathematician Otto Hölder (Hölder, 1901). Given that the physicist and measurement theorist Norman Robert Campbell dominated the Ferguson committee's deliberations, the committee concluded that measurement in the social sciences was impossible due to the lack of concatenation operations. This conclusion was later rendered false by the discovery of the theory of conjoint measurement by Debreu (1960) and independently by Luce & Tukey (1964). However, Stevens's reaction was not to conduct experiments to test for the presence of additive structure in sensations, but instead to render the conclusions of the Ferguson committee null and void by proposing a new theory of measurement:

Paraphrasing N. R. Campbell (Final Report, p. 340), we may say that measurement, in the broadest sense, is defined as the assignment of numerals to objects and events according to rules (Stevens, 1946, p. 677).

Stevens was greatly influenced by the ideas of another Harvard academic, the Nobel laureate physicist Percy Bridgman (1927), whose doctrine of operationalism Stevens used to define measurement. In Stevens's definition, for example, it is the use of a tape measure that defines length (the object of measurement) as being measurable (and so by implication quantitative). Critics of operationalism object that it confuses the relations between two objects or events for properties of one of those of objects or events (Moyer, 1981a, b; Rogers, 1989).

The Canadian measurement theorist William Rozeboom was an early and trenchant critic of Stevens's theory of scale types.

==== Same variable may be different scale type depending on context ====
Another issue is that the same variable may be a different scale type depending on how it is measured and on the goals of the analysis. For example, hair color is usually thought of as a nominal variable, since it has no apparent ordering. However, it is possible to order colors (including hair colors) in various ways, including by hue; this is known as colorimetry. Hue is an interval level variable.

== Summary table ==
The following table classifies the various simple data types, associated distributions, permissible operations, etc. Regardless of the logical possible values, all of these data types are generally coded using real numbers, because the theory of random variables often explicitly assumes that they hold real numbers.

Data Type	Possible values	Example usage	Level of measurement	Common Distributions	Scale of relative differences	Permissible statistics	Common model
binary	0, 1 (arbitrary labels)	Binary outcome ("yes/no", "true/false", "success/failure", etc.)	nominal scale	Bernoulli	incomparable	mode, chi-squared	logistic, probit
categorical	"name1", "name2", "name3", ... "nameK" (arbitrary labels)	Categorical outcome with names or places like "Rome", "Amsterdam", "Madrid", "London", "Washington" (specific blood type, political party, word, etc.)	nominal scale	categorical	incomparable	mode, chi-squared	multinomial logit, multinomial probit
ordinal	Ordering categories or integer or real number (arbitrary scale)	Ordering adjectives like "Small", "Medium", "Large", relative score, significant only for creating a ranking	ordinal scale	categorical	relative comparison		ordinal regression (ordered logit, ordered probit)
binomial	0, 1, ..., N	Number of successes (e.g. yes votes) out of N possible	interval scale	binomial, beta-binomial	additive	mean, median, mode, standard deviation, correlation	binomial regression (logistic, probit)
real-valued additive	real number	Temperature in degrees (Celsius or Fahrenheit), relative distance, location parameter, etc. (or approximately, anything not varying over a large scale)	interval scale	normal, etc. (usually symmetric about the mean)	additive	mean, median, mode, standard deviation, correlation	standard linear regression
count	nonnegative integers (0, 1, ...)	Number of items (telephone calls, people, molecules, births, deaths, etc.) in given interval/area/volume	ratio scale	Poisson, negative binomial	multiplicative	All statistics permitted for interval scales plus the following: geometric mean, harmonic mean, coefficient of variation	Poisson, negative binomial regression
real-valued multiplicative	positive real number	Temperature in kelvin, price, income, size, scale parameter, etc. (especially when varying over a large scale)	ratio scale	log-normal, gamma, exponential, etc. (usually a skewed distribution)	multiplicative	All statistics permitted for interval scales plus the following: geometric mean, harmonic mean, coefficient of variation	generalized linear model with logarithmic link

== See also ==
- Cohen's kappa
- Coherence (units of measurement)
- Hume's principle
- Inter-rater reliability
- Logarithmic scale
- Ramsey–Lewis method
- Set theory
- Statistical data type
- Transition (linguistics)
