= Qualitative property =

Properties not expressed numerically

Qualitative properties are properties that are observed and can generally not be measured with a numerical result, unlike quantitative properties, which have numerical characteristics.

== Description ==
Qualitative properties are properties that are observed and can generally not be measured with a numerical result. They are contrasted to quantitative properties which have numerical characteristics.

=== Evaluation ===
Although measuring something in qualitative terms is difficult, most people can (and will) make a judgement about a behaviour on the basis of how they feel treated. This indicates that qualitative properties are closely related to emotional impressions.

A test method can result in qualitative data about something. This can be a categorical result or a binary classification (e.g., pass/fail, go/no go, conform/non-conform). It can sometimes be an engineering judgement.

=== Categorization ===
The data that all share a qualitative property form a nominal category. A variable which codes for the presence or absence of such a property is called a binary categorical variable, or equivalently a dummy variable.

== Types ==
- Some engineering and scientific properties are qualitative.
- Some important qualitative properties that concern businesses are:
  - Human factors, human work capital is important issue that deals with qualitative properties. Some common aspects are work, motivation, general participation, etc. Although all of these aspects are not measurable in terms of quantitative criteria, the general overview of them could be summarized as a quantitative property.
  - Environmental issues are in some cases quantitatively measurable, but other properties are qualitative, including environmentally friendly manufacturing, responsibility for the entire life of a product (from the raw-material till scrap), attitudes towards safety, efficiency, and minimum waste production.
  - Ethical issues are closely related to environmental and human issues, and may be covered in corporate governance. Child labour and illegal dumping of waste are examples of ethical issues.
  - The way a company deals with its stockholders (the 'acting' of a company).

== See also ==
- Categorical variable
- Level of measurement
- Qualitative research
- Quantitative research
- Statistical data type
