= Value (mathematics) =

Notion in mathematics

In mathematics, a mathematical value is a broad term that refers to any definite entity that can be manipulated with operators according to the well-defined rules of its mathematical system.

Certain values can correspond to the real world, although most values in mathematics generally exist purely as abstract objects with no connection to the real world.

== Numerical values ==
Numbers (specifically the reals) are values that represent quantities. In that sense, numerical values are values that comprises or are made up of said numbers. In simpler terms, a numerical value are represented by numbers. Both numbers and numerical values tend to be synonymous and interchangeable with each other.

The following table shows certain values that are considered numerical values themselves.

Value	Brief description
Digit value	Digit value of a place of a number would simply be its digit or numeral.
Place value	The contribution of a digit to the value of a number is the value of the digit multiplied by a factor of 10 raised to the power of the digit's position.
Ratio	How many times one number contains another.
Rates	The quotient of two quantities.
Percentage	A number or ratio expressed as a fraction of 100
Central tendencies	A typical value for a probability distribution.

Because numerical values can also be a part of composite objects, various terminologies are given. For example, a complex number $z=a+bi$, has $a$ as considered its real part, likewise $b$ as its imaginary part.

== Variables ==
A variable is a symbol that represents an unspecified object. Homogeneous to numbers, variables themselves are considered as values.

== Functions ==
The value of a function, given the value(s) assigned to its argument(s), is the quantity assumed by the function for these argument values.

For example, if the function $f$ is defined by $f(x) = 2x^2 - 3x + 1$, then assigning the value 3 to its argument $x$ yields the function value 10, since $f(3) = 2\cdot 3^2 - 3\cdot 3 + 1 = 10$.

If the variable, expression or function only assumes real values, it is called real-valued. Likewise, a complex-valued variable, expression or function only assumes complex values.

== See also ==
- Value function
- Value (computer science)
- Value (physics)
- Absolute value
- Truth value
