= Michel Loève =

French mathematician (1907–1979)

- מישל לוב
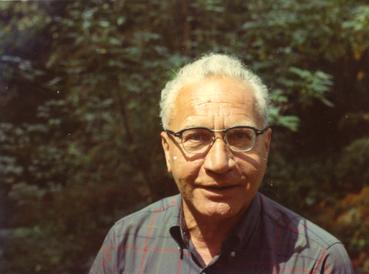
- Born: January 22, 1907; Jaffa, Ottoman Syria
- Died: February 17, 1979 (aged 72); Berkeley, California, US
- Education: University of Paris
- Known for: Karhunen–Loève theorem
- Scientific career
- Fields: Mathematics
- Workplaces: University of California, Berkeley; University of Lyon, University of Paris; University of London
- Doctoral advisor: Paul Lévy
- Doctoral students: Leo Breiman; Emanuel Parzen

Michel Loève (Hebrew: מישל לוב; January 22, 1907 – February 17, 1979) was a French-American probabilist and mathematical statistician, of Jewish origin. He is known in mathematical statistics and probability theory for the Karhunen–Loève theorem and Karhunen–Loève transform.

Michel Loève was born in Jaffa (then part of the Ottoman Empire) in 1907, to a Jewish family. He passed most of his childhood years in Egypt and received his primary and secondary education there in French schools. Later, after achieving the grades of B.L. in 1931 and A.B. in 1936, he studied mathematics at the Université de Paris under Paul Lévy, and received his Doctorat ès Sciences (Mathématiques) in 1941. In 1936 was employed as actuaire of the University of Lyon.

Because of his Jewish origin, he was arrested during the German occupation of France and sent to Drancy internment camp. One of his books is dedicated "To Line and To the students and teachers of the School in the Camp de Drancy". Having survived the Holocaust, after the liberation he became between 1944 and 1946 chief of research at the Institut Henri Poincaré at Paris University, then until 1948 worked at the University of London.

After one term as a visiting professor at Columbia University he accepted the position of professor of mathematics at Berkeley, in 1955 adding the title professor of statistics.

He is the author of one of the earliest books on measure-theoretic probability theory and one of the best known textbooks. He is memorialized via the Loève Prize created by his widow Line.

== See also ==
- Kari Karhunen
- Harold Hotelling
