= Kari Karhunen =

Finnish mathematician (1915–1992)

- Born: April 12, 1915; Helsinki, Finland
- Died: September 16, 1992 (aged 77); Helsinki, Finland
- Education: University of Helsinki
- Known for: Karhunen–Loève theorem
- Scientific career
- Fields: Mathematics
- Workplaces: University of Helsinki
- Doctoral advisor: Rolf Nevanlinna

Kari Onni Uolevi Karhunen (April 12, 1915 – September 16, 1992) was a Finnish probabilist and a mathematical statistician. He is best known for the Karhunen–Loève theorem and Karhunen–Loève transform.

== Education and career ==
Karhunen received his master's degree in 1938 and his doctorate in 1950 from the University of Helsinki. The topic of his thesis was (in German) Über lineare Methoden in der Wahrscheinlichkeitsrechnung, in English On linear methods in probability and statistics. The advisor of his thesis was the mathematician Rolf Nevanlinna.

Karhunen worked as a lecturer at the University of Helsinki before leaving the academic world to be employed by the insurance corporation Suomi, becoming CEO of the company in 1963.

Karhunen served in 1955 on the Finnish Committee for Mathematical Machines, which developed the first Finnish computer ESKO.

== See also ==
- Michel Loève
- Harold Hotelling
- Principal component analysis
