= James O. Ramsay =

Canadian statistician

Professor James O. Ramsay
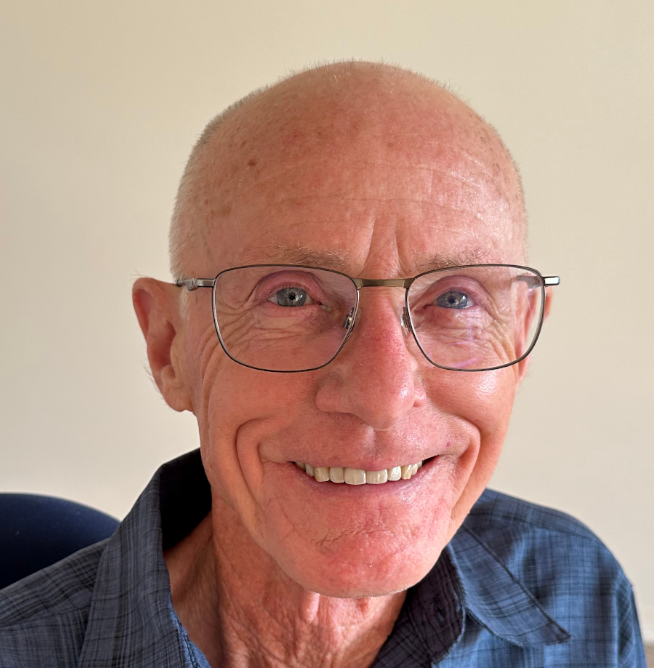
- Born: September 5, 1942 (age 84); Prince George, British Columbia, Canada
- Education: University of Alberta; Princeton University
- Known for: functional data analysis
- Scientific career
- Workplaces: University College London; McGill University
- Doctoral advisor: Harold Gulliksen
- Other academic advisors: Stephen M. Hunka

James O. Ramsay (born 5 September 1942) is a Canadian statistician and Professor Emeritus at McGill University, Montreal, who developed much of the statistical theory behind multidimensional scaling (MDS). Together with co-author Bernard Silverman, he is widely recognized as the founder of functional data analysis. He wrote four influential books and over 100 peer-reviewed articles in statistical and psychometric journals.

In 1998, the Statistical Society of Canada (SSC) awarded him a gold medal for research in 1998. In 2012 the SCS awarded him with an honorary membership. He was president of the Psychometric Society in 1981–1982 and president of the SSC in 2002–2003. Over his career, "three of his papers were read to the Royal Statistical Society, and another won The Canadian Journal of Statistics 2000 Best Paper Award."

In retirement, as of 2010, he continued to hold adjunct appointments at Department of Chemical Engineering, Queen's University and the Department of Mathematics and Statistics, University of Ottawa. Following his retirement from McGill University, Ramsay moved to Ottawa with his wife, where he continued his research and mentored students.

== Family life ==
James Ramsay was born in Prince George, British Columbia on 5 September 1942, but didn't reside there long. In his early years, the family spent time in Smithers, British Columbia, Richdale, Alberta, Flaxcombe, Saskatchewan, and Wainwright, Alberta. His father worked as a telegrapher on the Canadian National Railway.

He has five children with his wife, Maureen. His son Tim Ramsay grew up to become a statistician, winning a Pierre Robillard Award while attending Queen's University in Kingston, Ontario; they have since collaborated on publications in their professional relationship.

== Education ==
Ramsay was an avid reader of Charles Dickens by the age of 12. "Through literature I became interested in basically everything" except for mathematics, which he regarded during his high school years as trivial and non-interesting. He attended the University of Alberta for his undergraduate degree, studying literature, linguistics, and psychology, attaining a bachelor's degree in Education. While attending the University of Alberta, he aced an introductory course in statistics, which lead him to calculus, his first taste of advanced mathematics. "That was a real eye-opener to me; it just blew me away!" The degree program did not offer him many opportunities to take further math instruction, but his preferred learning style was autodidactic, and he often skipped lectures in order to read at home, where he could read as he chose.

Upon graduating in 1964, his mentor, psychometrician Stephen M. Hunka encouraged him to apply to graduate programs at Berkeley, Illinois, and Princeton; with his relatively weak background in mathematics, he was surprised to be accepted by all three. He chose Princeton where he had a "hefty fellowship" from the Educational Testing Service (ETS). At Princeton, his formal supervisor was Harold Gulliksen. Ramsay's Princeton dissertation (1966) concerned MDS, "formalizing seminal contributions to the mathematical formulation" by Joseph Kruskal. During his time at Princeton, he had regular contact with research scientists at Bell Labs, including Joseph Kruskal, John Chambers (creator of the S programming language; core member of the R programming language project), and Douglas Carroll, a leading psychometrician of the era.

== Career ==
Ramsay joined the Department of Psychology at McGill at a high ebb; at that time the department was associated with Donald Hebb (pioneering work in neural networks), Ronald Melzack (pain), Virginia Douglas (hyperactivity), and Dalbir Bindra (comparative and physiological psychology). His colleagues and collaborators over a long career include James V. Zidek (O.C.), Joseph Kruskal, Suzanne Winsberg, Melvin R. Novick, James B. Ramsey, Nancy E. Heckman, and Giles Hooker.

Over the years Ramsay took sabbaticals at University College London, Grenoble, and Toulouse.

His professional influences include Karl Jöreskog, Frederic Lord, Duncan Luce, and Peter J. Huber.

== Interests ==
Ramsay's favourite fiction author is George Eliot. "In my mind she stands head and shoulders above everybody else in the whole field of English literature, the giant among giants." His favourite biography concerns Sir William Osler, born in rural Ontario, Canada in 1849, who went on to become one of the four founding fathers of Johns Hopkins Hospital, and made pioneering contributions to the system of medical residency.

During his youth and adult years, Ramsay was a keen cyclist. At age 16 he completed a 1400 km journey though the Canadian Rockies, much of it on a one-track logging road that subsequently became the Yellowhead Highway. Later on, during his European sabbaticals, he sought out bicycle routes used in the professional tour. Due to his own misjudgement, he was once taken off the Col du Galibier by ambulance in an advanced state of hypothermia.

== Publications ==
- Ramsay, James Owen (2017), Dynamic Data Analysis: Modeling Data with Differential Equations, LCCN 2017941073, OL 20847136W, Wikidata Q129792064
- Ramsay, James Owen; Hooker, Giles; Graves, Spencer (2009). Functional data analysis with R and Matlab. Springer Science+Business Media. ISBN 978-0-387-98184-0. LCCN 2009928040. OL 25534744M. Wikidata Q105545530.
- Ramsay, J.O., Hooker, G., Campbell, D. & Cao, J. (2007). Parameter estimation for differential equations: A generalized smoothing approach. Journal of the Royal Statistical Society, Series B, 69, 741–796.
- Ramsay, J.O. & Silverman, B. W. (2005). Functional Data Analysis (2nd Ed.). New York: Springer-Verlag.
- Malfait, N. & Ramsay, J.O. (2003). The historical functional linear model. Canadian Journal of Statistics, 31, 115–128.
- Ramsay, J. O. (1988). Monotone Regression Splines in Action. Institute of Mathematical Statistics, 3(4), 425-441.
- Ramsay, J. O. (1977). Maximum likelihood estimation in multidimensional scaling. Psychometrika, 42(2), 241–266.
