= Square-integrable function =

Function whose squared absolute value has finite integral

In mathematics, a square-integrable function, also called a quadratically integrable function or $L^2$ function or square-summable function, is a real- or complex-valued measurable function for which the integral of the square of the absolute value is finite. Thus, square-integrability on the real line $(-\infty, +\infty)$ is defined as follows.

$f : \Reals \to \Complex \text{ square integrable} \quad \iff \quad \int_{-\infty}^\infty |f(x)|^2 \, \mathrm dx < \infty$

One may also speak of quadratic integrability over bounded intervals such as $[a,b]$ for $a \leq b$.

$f : [a,b] \to \Complex \text{ square integrable on } [a,b] \quad \iff \quad \int_a^b |f(x)|^2 \, \mathrm dx < \infty$

An equivalent definition is to say that the square of the function itself (rather than of its absolute value) is Lebesgue integrable. For this to be true, the integrals of the positive and negative portions of the real part must both be finite, as well as those for the imaginary part.

The vector space of (equivalence classes of) square integrable functions (with respect to Lebesgue measure) forms the $L^p$ space with $p = 2.$ Among the $L^p$ spaces, the class of square integrable functions is unique in being compatible with an inner product, which allows notions like angle and orthogonality to be defined. Along with this inner product, the square integrable functions form a Hilbert space, since all of the $L^p$ spaces are complete under their respective $p$-norms.

Often the term is used not to refer to a specific function, but to equivalence classes of functions that are equal almost everywhere.

== Properties ==
The square integrable functions (in the sense mentioned in which a "function" actually means an equivalence class of functions that are equal almost everywhere) form an inner product space with inner product given by
$$\langle f, g \rangle = \int_A \overline{f(x)}\ g(x) \mathrm dx,$$
where

- $f$ and $g$ are square integrable functions,
- $\overline{f(x)}$ is the complex conjugate of $f(x),$
- $A$ is the set over which one integrates—in the first definition (given in the introduction above), $A$ is $(-\infty, +\infty)$, in the second, $A$ is $[a, b]$.

Since $|a|^2 = a \cdot \overline{a}$, square integrability is the same as saying
$$\langle f, f \rangle < \infty. \,$$

It can be shown that square integrable functions form a complete metric space under the metric induced by the inner product defined above. A complete metric space is also called a Cauchy space, because sequences in such metric spaces converge if and only if they are Cauchy. A space that is complete under the metric induced by a norm is a Banach space. Therefore, the space of square integrable functions is a Banach space, under the metric induced by the norm, which in turn is induced by the inner product. As we have the additional property of the inner product, this is specifically a Hilbert space, because the space is complete under the metric induced by the inner product.

This inner product space is conventionally denoted by $\left(L_2, \langle\cdot, \cdot\rangle_2\right)$ and many times abbreviated as $L_2.$ Note that $L_2$ denotes the set of square integrable functions, but no selection of metric, norm or inner product are specified by this notation. The set, together with the specific inner product $\langle\cdot, \cdot\rangle_2$ specifies the inner product space.

The space of square integrable functions is the $L^p$ space in which $p = 2.$

== Examples ==
The function $\tfrac{1}{x^n},$ defined on $(0, 1),$ is in $L^2$ for $n < \tfrac{1}{2}$ but not for $n = \tfrac{1}{2}.$ The function $\tfrac{1}{x},$ defined on $[1, \infty),$ is square-integrable.

Bounded functions, defined on $[0, 1],$ are square-integrable. These functions are also in $L^p,$ for any value of $p.$

=== Non-examples ===
The function $\tfrac{1}{x},$ defined on $[0, 1],$ where the value at $0$ is arbitrary. Furthermore, this function is not in $L^p$ for any value of $p$ in $[1, \infty).$

== See also ==
- Inner product space
- $L^p$ space – Function spaces generalizing finite-dimensional p norm spaces
