= Bent Jørgensen (statistician) =

Danish statistician

- Born: 15 April 1954; Askeby, Denmark
- Died: 19 November 2015 (aged 61); Odense, Denmark
- Education: Aarhus University; Odense University; Aalborg University
- Known for: Exponential dispersion models; Tweedie distributions; Tweedie convergence theorem; Scale invariance; Taylor's power law
- Scientific career
- Institutions: Instituto de Matemática Pura e Aplicada; University of British Columbia; Odense University; University of Southern Denmark
- Doctoral advisor: Ole Barndorff-Nielsen

Bent Jørgensen (15 April 1954 – 19 November 2015) was a Danish statistician from the University of Southern Denmark whose research was focused on two related topics in statistics: dispersion models and the analysis of non-normal correlated data.

== Education and career ==
Jørgensen studied statistics and was conferred a Cand. Scient. degree in 1979 from Aarhus University followed by a Ph.D. in 1987 (Odense University) and Dr. Scient. in 1997 (Aalborg University). In 1987 he joined the Instituto de Matemática Pura e Aplicada at Rio de Janeiro, and from 1992 to 1997 he was affiliated with the University of British Columbia in Canada. His subsequent appointments were with Odense University and the University of Southern Denmark.

== Research ==
Jørgensen identified a number of other classes of dispersion models which included the multivariate dispersion models, the dispersion models for extremes and the dispersion models for geometric sums. Dispersion models serve as error distributions for generalized linear models and represent a broad class of distributions that allow for the analysis of data that go beyond the restrictions of the normal distribution. These models include both the proper dispersion models and the exponential dispersion models.

He had an interest in a class of exponential dispersion models identified by Maurice Tweedie characterized by closure under additive and reproductive convolution as well as under transformations of scale that are now called the Tweedie distributions. These models express a power law relationship between the variance and the mean which manifests in ecological systems where it is known as Taylor's law and in physical systems where it is known as fluctuation scaling.

Jørgensen proved a number of convergence theorems, related to the central limit theorem, that specified the asymptotic behavior of the variance functions of the Tweedie models. These theorems would indicate that certain types of Tweedie models should have a role as equilibrium distributions in natural systems. They can be used to explain the origin of Taylor's law as well as 1/f noise and multifractality.

Consequent to Jørgensen's work the Tweedie distributions and their convergence theorem have provided mechanistic insight into complicated natural systems that manifest features of self-organized criticality and random fractals.

== Selected works ==
- Jørgensen B (1982). Statistical properties of the generalized inverse Gaussian distribution. Springer. ISBN 978-0-387-90665-2.
- Jørgensen B (1993). Theory of linear models. Chapman & Hall. ISBN 0-412-04261-4.
- Jørgensen, B (1997). "Proper dispersion models (with Discussion)". Braz J Statist. 11: 89–140.
- Jørgensen, B (1997). The theory of dispersion models. Chapman & Hall. ISBN 978-0-412-99711-2.
- Jørgensen, B; Lauritzen, SL (2000). "Multivariate dispersion models". J Multivar Anal. 74 (2): 267–281. doi:10.1006/jmva.1999.1885.
- Jørgensen, B; Goegebeur, Y; Martínez, JR (2010). "Dispersion models for extremes". Extremes. 13 (4): 399–437. arXiv:0712.4323. doi:10.1007/s10687-009-0093-7. S2CID 15583681.
- Jørgensen, B; Kokonendji, CC (2011). "Dispersion models for geometric sums". Braz J Probab Stat. 25 (3): 263–293. doi:10.1214/10-bjps136.
- Jørgensen, B; Martinez, JR; Tsao, M (1994). "Asymptotic behaviour of the variance function". Scand J Statist. 21: 223–243.
