= Inverse square potential =

In quantum mechanics, the inverse square potential is a form of a central force potential which has the unusual property of the eigenstates of the corresponding Hamiltonian operator remaining eigenstates in a scaling of all cartesian coordinates by the same constant. Apart from this curious feature, it's by far less important central force problem than that of the Keplerian inverse square force system.

== Description ==
The potential energy function of an inverse square potential is

$V(r) = -\frac{C}{r^2}$,

where $C$ is some constant and $r$ is the Euclidean distance from some central point. If $C$ is positive, the potential is attractive and if $C$ is negative, the potential is repulsive. The corresponding Hamiltonian operator $\hat{H}(\hat{\mathbf{p}},\hat {r})$ is

$\hat{H} = \frac{\hat{\mathbf{p}}^2}{2m} - \frac{C}{\hat{r}^2}$,

where $m$ is the mass of the particle moving in the potential.

== Properties ==
The canonical commutation relation of quantum mechanics, $[\hat{x}_i,\hat{p}_i] = i\hbar$, has the property of being invariant in a scaling

$\hat{p}_i' = \hat{p}_i/\lambda$, and $\hat{x}_i' = \lambda\hat{x}_i$,

where $\lambda$ is some scaling factor. The momentum $\mathbf{p}$ and the position $\mathbf{x}$ are vectors, while the components $p_i$,$x_i$ and the radius $r$ are scalars. In an inverse square potential system, if a wavefunction $\psi (r)$ is an eigenfunction of the Hamiltonian operator $\hat{H}(\hat{\mathbf{p}},\hat{\mathbf{x}})$, it is also an eigenfunction of the operator $\hat{H}(\hat{\mathbf{p}}',\hat{\mathbf{x}}')$, where the scaled operators $\hat{p}_ {i}'$ and $\hat{x}_{i}'$ are defined as above.

This also means that if a radially symmetric wave function $\psi (r)$ is an eigenfunction of $\hat{H}$ with eigenvalue $E$, then also $\psi (\lambda r)$ is an eigenfunction, with eigenvalue $\lambda^2 E$. Therefore, the energy spectrum of the system is a continuum of values.

The system with a particle in an inverse square potential with positive $C$ (attractive potential) is an example of so-called falling-to-center problem, where there is no lowest energy wavefunction and there are eigenfunctions where the particle is arbitrarily localized in the vicinity of the central point $r=0$.

== See also ==
- Canonical commutation relation
- Central force
- Scale invariance
