= Masaaki Morisita =

Japanese biologist

- 森下正明
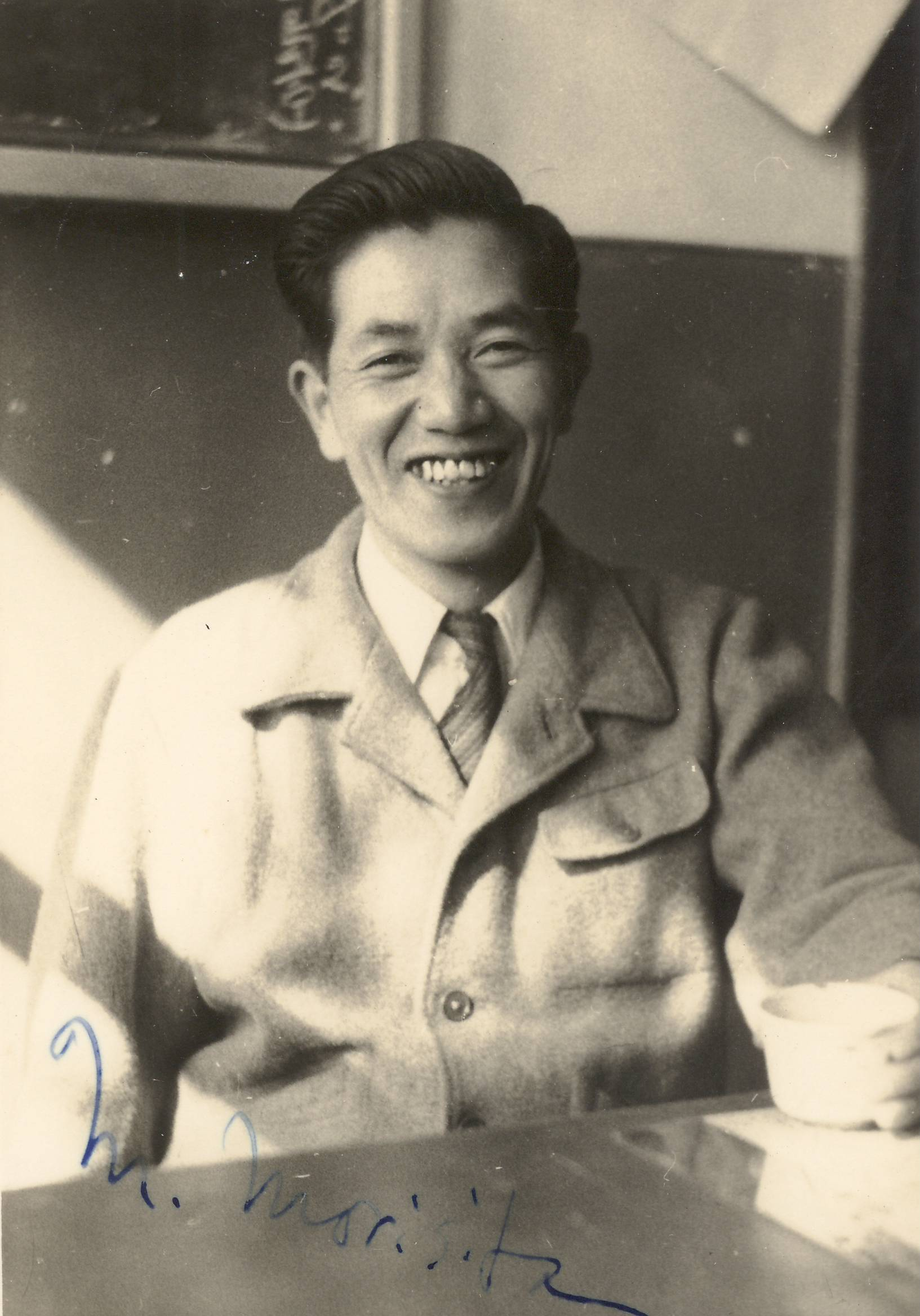
- Morisita in 1949
- Born: January 27, 1913; Osaka, Osaka Prefecture, Japan
- Died: February 25, 1997 (aged 84); Kyoto, Kyoto Prefecture, Japan
- Education: Kyoto University (BA, PhD)
- Scientific career
- Fields: Ecology; Zoology
- Workplaces: Kyoto University

Masaaki Morisita (森下正明光) (27 January 1913 - 25 February 1997) was a Japanese ecologist and professor emeritus of animal ecology at Kyoto University. He is known as the father of population ecology in Japan. Morisita's overlap index and Morisita's index of dispersion are named after him.

In addition to his work on statistical ecology, he also studied the natural history of Japanese ants. With several other myrmecologists, he produced a complete catalogue of ants in Japan. Three species of ants are named after him (Pyramica morisitai, Proceratium morisitai , and Lasius morisitai).

== Biography ==
Morisita was born in Osaka and spent his high school years in Kōchi. He obtained a bachelor's of agriculture at Kyoto University in 1932, and later a doctorate of science in 1950. He studied the water strider Gerris lacustris as part of his graduate studies. After graduating, he worked as a professor in the department of biology at Kyushu University. He later became a professor in the zoology department of Kyoto University. In 1976, he retired and was named professor emeritus.

He published the book Studies on Methods of Estimating Population Density, Biomass, and Productivity in Terrestrial Animals in 1977.

He was awarded the Zoological Society of Japan Award in 1964, and the Order of the Rising Sun, 3rd Class in 1986. After his death, the Morisita Memorial & Research Foundation was named in his honor.

== Name ==
Like many academics from Kyoto University, Morisita had a preference for the spelling of his name in foreign language papers, writing it as "Morisita" using Kunrei-shiki romanization, rather than the English-based Hepburn romanization "Morishita".
