= Exponential dispersion model =

Set of probability distributions

In probability and statistics, the class of exponential dispersion models (EDM), also called exponential dispersion family (EDF), is a set of probability distributions that represents a generalisation of the natural exponential family. Exponential dispersion models play an important role in statistical theory, in particular in generalized linear models because they have a special structure which enables deductions to be made about appropriate statistical inference.

== Definition ==
=== Univariate case ===
There are two versions to formulate an exponential dispersion model.

==== Additive exponential dispersion model ====
In the univariate case, a real-valued random variable $X$ belongs to the additive exponential dispersion model with canonical parameter $\theta$ and index parameter $\lambda$, $X \sim \mathrm{ED}^*(\theta, \lambda)$, if its probability density function can be written as

$$f_X(x\mid\theta, \lambda) = h^*(\lambda,x) \exp\left(\theta x - \lambda A(\theta)\right) \,\! .$$

==== Reproductive exponential dispersion model ====
The distribution of the transformed random variable $Y=\frac{X}{\lambda}$ is called reproductive exponential dispersion model, $Y \sim \mathrm{ED}(\mu, \sigma^2)$, and is given by

$$f_Y(y\mid\mu, \sigma^2) = h(\sigma^2,y) \exp\left(\frac{\theta y - A(\theta)}{\sigma^2}\right) \,\! ,$$

with $\sigma^2 = \frac{1}{\lambda}$ and $\mu = A'(\theta)$, implying $\theta = (A')^{-1}(\mu)$. The terminology dispersion model stems from interpreting $\sigma^2$ as dispersion parameter. For fixed parameter $\sigma^2$, the $\mathrm{ED}(\mu, \sigma^2)$ is a natural exponential family.

=== Multivariate case ===
In the multivariate case, the n-dimensional random variable $\mathbf{X}$ has a probability density function of the following form

$$f_{\mathbf{X}}(\mathbf{x}|\boldsymbol{\theta}, \lambda) = h(\lambda,\mathbf{x}) \exp\left(\lambda(\boldsymbol\theta^\top \mathbf{x} - A(\boldsymbol\theta))\right) \,\!,$$

where the parameter $\boldsymbol\theta$ has the same dimension as $\mathbf{X}$.

== Properties ==
=== Cumulant-generating function ===
The cumulant-generating function of $Y\sim\mathrm{ED}(\mu,\sigma^2)$ is given by

$$K(t;\mu,\sigma^2) = \log\operatorname{E}[e^{tY}] = \frac{A(\theta+\sigma^2 t)-A(\theta)}{\sigma^2}\,\! ,$$

with $\theta = (A')^{-1}(\mu)$

=== Mean and variance ===
Mean and variance of $Y\sim\mathrm{ED}(\mu,\sigma^2)$ are given by

$$\operatorname{E}[Y]= \mu = A'(\theta) \,, \quad \operatorname{Var}[Y] = \sigma^2 A''(\theta) = \sigma^2 V(\mu)\,\! ,$$

with unit variance function $V(\mu) = A''((A')^{-1}(\mu))$.

=== Reproductive ===
If $Y_1,\ldots, Y_n$ are i.i.d. with $Y_i\sim\mathrm{ED}\left(\mu,\frac{\sigma^2}{w_i}\right)$, i.e. same mean $\mu$ and different weights $w_i$, the weighted mean is again an $\mathrm{ED}$ with

$$\sum_{i=1}^n \frac{w_i Y_i}{w_{\bullet}} \sim \mathrm{ED}\left(\mu, \frac{\sigma^2}{w_\bullet}\right) \,\! ,$$

with $w_\bullet = \sum_{i=1}^n w_i$. Therefore $Y_i$ are called reproductive.

=== Unit deviance ===
The probability density function of an $\mathrm{ED}(\mu, \sigma^2)$ can also be expressed in terms of the unit deviance $d(y,\mu)$ as

$$f_Y(y\mid\mu, \sigma^2) = \tilde{h}(\sigma^2,y) \exp\left(-\frac{d(y,\mu)}{2\sigma^2}\right) \,\! ,$$

where the unit deviance takes the special form $d(y,\mu) = y f(\mu) + g(\mu) + h(y)$ or in terms of the unit variance function as $d(y,\mu) = 2 \int_\mu^y\! \frac{y-t}{V(t)} \,dt$.

== Examples ==
Many very common probability distributions belong to the class of EDMs, among them are: normal distribution, binomial distribution, Poisson distribution, negative binomial distribution, gamma distribution, inverse Gaussian distribution, and Tweedie distribution.
