= Peter Dixon (economist) =

Australian economist

Peter Bishop Dixon AO FASSA (born 23 July 1946) is an Australian economist known for his work in general equilibrium theory and computable general equilibrium models. He has published several books and more than two hundred academic papers on economic modelling and economic policy analysis.

== Career ==
Born in Melbourne to Herbert Bishop Dixon and Margaret Vera Laybourne-Smith, Dixon attended Melbourne Grammar School and Monash University (BEc, 1967), Harvard (AM, PhD 1972) where he worked as teaching assistant from 1970 to 1972.

Dixon then worked from 1972 until 1974 for the International Monetary Fund in Washington and for the Reserve Bank of Australia in Sydney in 1974/75. In 1974 he returned to Monash University. As a senior lecturer in the economics department and consultant to the Australian government's IMPACT project under Alan Powell until 1978, he started work on general equilibrium theory. Powell and Dixon were the joint recipients of the 1983 Research Medal of the Royal Society of Victoria. Dixon then worked as professor of economics at La Trobe University until 1984, with a visiting professorship at Harvard University in 1983. From 1984 until 1991, Dixon was professor of economics at the University of Melbourne and director of the Melbourne Institute of Applied Economic and Social Research. From 1991 until 2014 he served as director, later principal researcher, of the Centre of Policy Studies (CoPS) at Monash University. CoPS and Dixon then moved to Victoria University.

Dixon is mainly known for developing, with his collaborators, computable general equilibrium (CGE) models. A further development of Leif Johansen's multi-sectoral model, Dixon's ORANI model (1977, 1982), named after his wife, built on work by Paul Armington and Wassily Leontief its dynamic further development, the MONASH/VU-National model, and the US Applied General Equilibrium (USAGE) model which is widely used by the US government and the Global Trade Analysis Project. These models are available in CoPS's Gempack/RunGEM software implementation.

Dixon and his wife, Orani, have been married since 1968, and they have two daughters, including the academic Prof. Dr. Janine Margaret Dixon. Dixon is member of the Melbourne Cricket Club.

== Awards ==
- 1982: Fellow of the Academy of the Social Sciences in Australia
- 1983: Dixon and Alan Powell were joint recipients of the Research Medal of the Royal Society of Victoria
- 1990: Giblin lecturer at the 59th ANZAAS congress
- 2001: Centenary Medal
- 2003: Distinguished Fellowship of the Economic Society of Australia
- 2006: Sir John Monash Distinguished Professor at Monash University
- 2015: Elected to the Hall of Fame in the Global Trade Analysis Project
- 2014: Appointed Officer of the Order of Australia (AO) in the 2014 Queen's Birthday Honours

== Publications ==
Dixon has published more than 200 working papers and contributed to several journals and books. His major books include:

- Dixon, Peter B. (1975). The Theory of Joint Maximization. Contributions to Economic Analysis (91). North-Holland. ISBN 0444107924, based on The Theory of Joint Maximazation (PhD). Harvard University. 1972.
- with Parmenter, Brian R[ichard]; Ryland, G[eorge] J.; Sutton, John M. (1977). Orani, A Multisectoral Model of the Australian Economy: Current Specifications and Illustrations of Use for Policy Analysis. First Progress Report of the IMPACT Project, Vol. 2. Canberra: Australian Government Publishing Service.
- with Powell, Alan A[nthony]; Parmenter, Brian R. (1979). Structural Adaptation in an Ailing Macroeconomy. Melbourne University Press. ISBN 978-0522841886.
- with Bowles, S.; Kendrick, D[avid Andrew] (1980). Notes and Problems in Microeconomic Theory. Amsterdam: North-Holland.
- with Parmenter, Brian R.; Sutton, John M.; Vincent, David P. (1982). Orani: A Multisectoral Model of the Australian Economy. Contributions to Economic Analysis (142). Amsterdam: North-Holland. ISBN 0-444-86294-3.
- with Parmenter, Brian R.; Powell, Alan A.; Wilcoxen, Peter J.; Pearson, Ken R. (1992). Notes and Problems in Applied General Equilibrium Economics. North-Holland. ISBN 978-0-444-88449-7.
- with Rimmer, Maureen T. (2002). Dynamic General Equilibrium Modelling for Forecasting and Policy: A Practical Guide and Documentation of MONASH. Contributions to economic analysis (256). Amsterdam: Elsevier. ISBN 0444512608.
- with Jorgenson, Dale W., eds. (2012). Handbook of Computable General Equilibrium Modelling (2 volumes). North-Holland.
- with Jerie, Michael; Rimmer, Maureen T. (2018). Trade Theory in Computable General Equilibrium Models. Advances in Applied General Equilibrium Modeling. Singapore: Springer Nature. ISBN 978-981-10-8323-5.
- with Jerie, Michael; Rimmer, Maureen T.; Wittwer, Glyn (2019). "Rapid Assessment of the Economic Implications of Terrorism Events Using a Regional CGE Model: Creating GRAD-ECAT". In Okuyama, Yasuhide; Rose, Adam (eds.). Advances in Spatial and Economic Modeling of Disaster Impacts. Advances in Spatial Science. Cham, Switzerland: Springer Nature. pp. 121–161. doi:10.1007/978-3-030-16237-5_6. ISBN 978-3-030-16236-8. S2CID 211450682.
