= Melbourne Institute of Applied Economic and Social Research =

Australian economic research institute

The Melbourne Institute of Applied Economic and Social Research (often simply referred to as "The Melbourne Institute") is an Australian economic research institute based in Melbourne, Victoria. The institute is a department of the Faculty of Business and Economics at the University of Melbourne.

== History ==
The Melbourne Institute was formed in 1962 as the "Institute of Applied Economic Research" under the leadership of Professor Ronald Henderson. It was the first economic research institute in an Australian university. Henderson built up an organisation with about 40 staff by the early 1970s. It engaged in a wide range of research areas including macroeconomic forecasting, financial economics and social economics, and is best remembered for its work on poverty and the development of the Henderson Poverty Line. The name of the institute was later changed to "Institute of Applied Economic and Social Research" (IAESR) and then to "Melbourne Institute of Applied Economic and Social Research".

After the Henderson era, Duncan Ironmonger acted as director for five years before Professor Peter Dixon was appointed director.

After some restructuring, the new Melbourne Institute based its operation around Dixon's ORANI computable general equilibrium model of the Australian economy. In the early 1990s, Peter Dixon and a number of his senior colleagues left the institute to join Monash University. This necessitated a second period of adjustment and restructuring initiated by Professor Richard Blandy who was director from 1992 to 1994.

Professor Peter Dawkins took up his position as director in January 1996. In that year, the director and his senior management team, in association with the staff and the advisory board, developed a strategic plan with the unifying theme being the link between economic performance and social outcomes. The first version of this plan was for the period 1996–2000 and it is updated annually. In that year, the name of the institute was changed to "Melbourne Institute: Applied Economic & Social Research".

Professor John Freebairn was appointed director in 2005 and returned to the Department of Economics in 2007. Stephen Sedgwick, former board member of the Asian Development Bank, was director from August 2007 until July 2009. In April 2010, Professor Deborah Cobb-Clark was appointed the director and Ronald Henderson Professor. In 2016, Professor A. Abigail Payne was appointed director and Ronald Henderson Professor.

In 2024, Professor Beth Webster was appointed as director and Ronald Henderson Professor. During her tenure the name of the institute changed back to "Melbourne Institute of Applied Economic and Social Research" (removing the colon and ampersand symbols). The institute was restructured into six key research areas: Disadvantage and Wellbeing in the Asia-Pacific, Family and Labour Economics, Health Economics, HILDA (Household, Income and Labour Dynamics in Australia Survey), Macroeconomics, and Wellbeing and Economic Empowerment.

== Highlights ==
- The Melbourne Institute manages the Household, Income and Labour Dynamics in Australia (HILDA) household panel survey, a national longitudinal study of household economies, labour force participation and family change. As part of this project, each year the Melbourne Institute produces the HILDA Statistical Report.
- The institute produces regular macroeconomic reports, which track consumer sentiment and economic activity (resulting in widespread media commentary in Australia).
- The institute produces regular reports and academic articles on indigenous economics; the impact of early childhood education; financing the health system; financial well-being; access to health services; the causes of labour market disadvantage and the development of economies in the Asia-Pacific region.
- The institute is the Melbourne node of the Life Course Centre, an Australian Research Council Centre of Excellence.
- The institute and The Australian newspaper present the Economic and Social Outlook Conference.
