= DeMatha Catholic High School =

Private school in Hyattsville, Maryland, US

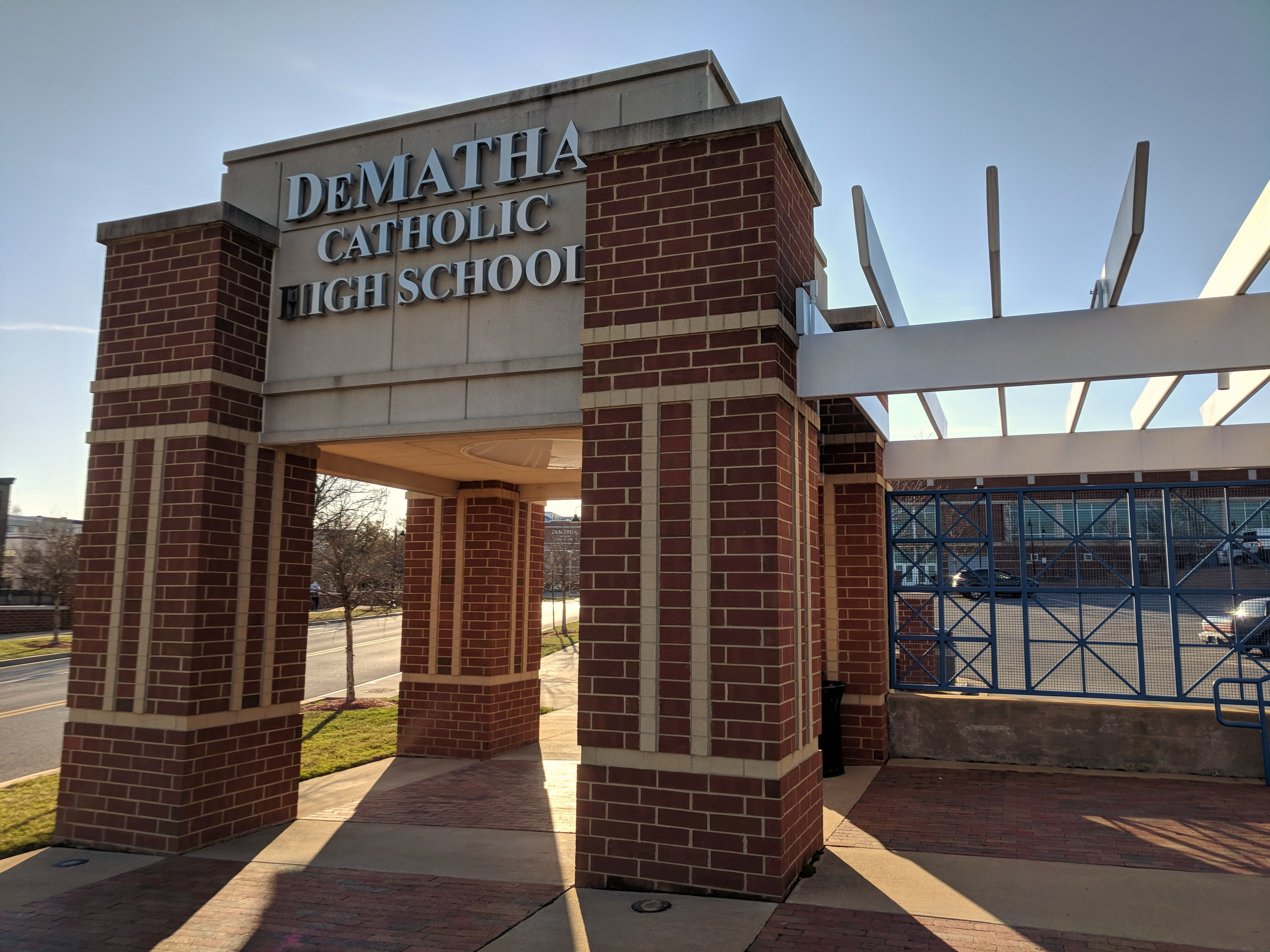
- DeMatha's Hyattsville campus

Location
- 4313 Madison Street; Hyattsville, Maryland 20781; United States; 38°57′29″N 76°56′32″W

Information
- Type: Private, College-prep
- Motto: Faith Filled Gentlemen & Scholars
- Religious affiliation: Roman Catholic
- Patron saint: St. John of Matha
- Established: 1946
- Founder: Trinitarian Order
- School district: Archdiocese of Washington Catholic Schools
- Principal: Daniel McMahon
- Teaching staff: 85.0 (on an FTE basis)
- Grades: 9–12
- Gender: Boys
- Enrollment: 850 (2025-26)
- Student to teacher ratio: 9.5
- Campus size: 10 acres (40,000 m^{2})
- Campus type: Suburban
- Colors: Red and blue
- Song: DeMatha Forever!
- Fight song: One DeMatha
- Athletics conference: Washington Catholic Athletic Conference
- Nickname: Stags
- Accreditation: Middle States Association of Colleges and Schools
- Publication: "Red & Blue Review" and "DeMatha Express"
- Newspaper: The DeMatha Stagline
- Tuition: $25,350 (2026)
- Website: www.dematha.org

DeMatha Catholic High School is a four-year Catholic high school for boys located in Hyattsville, Maryland, United States. Named after John of Matha, DeMatha is under the Roman Catholic Archdiocese of Washington and is a member of the Washington Catholic Athletic Conference.

== History ==
In 1990, 21 girls from Regina High School were allowed to attend DeMatha for their final year of high school after their school closed.

== Academics ==
The United States Department of Education recognized DeMatha as a Blue Ribbon School in 1984 and 1991.

== Music program ==
According to the school's website, the music program includes "five concert bands, three choruses, three percussion ensembles, three string orchestras, six levels of music theory, and a History of Rock and Roll class" plus "two jazz ensembles, a pep band for basketball games, a gospel choir, as well as numerous small ensembles."

== Athletics ==
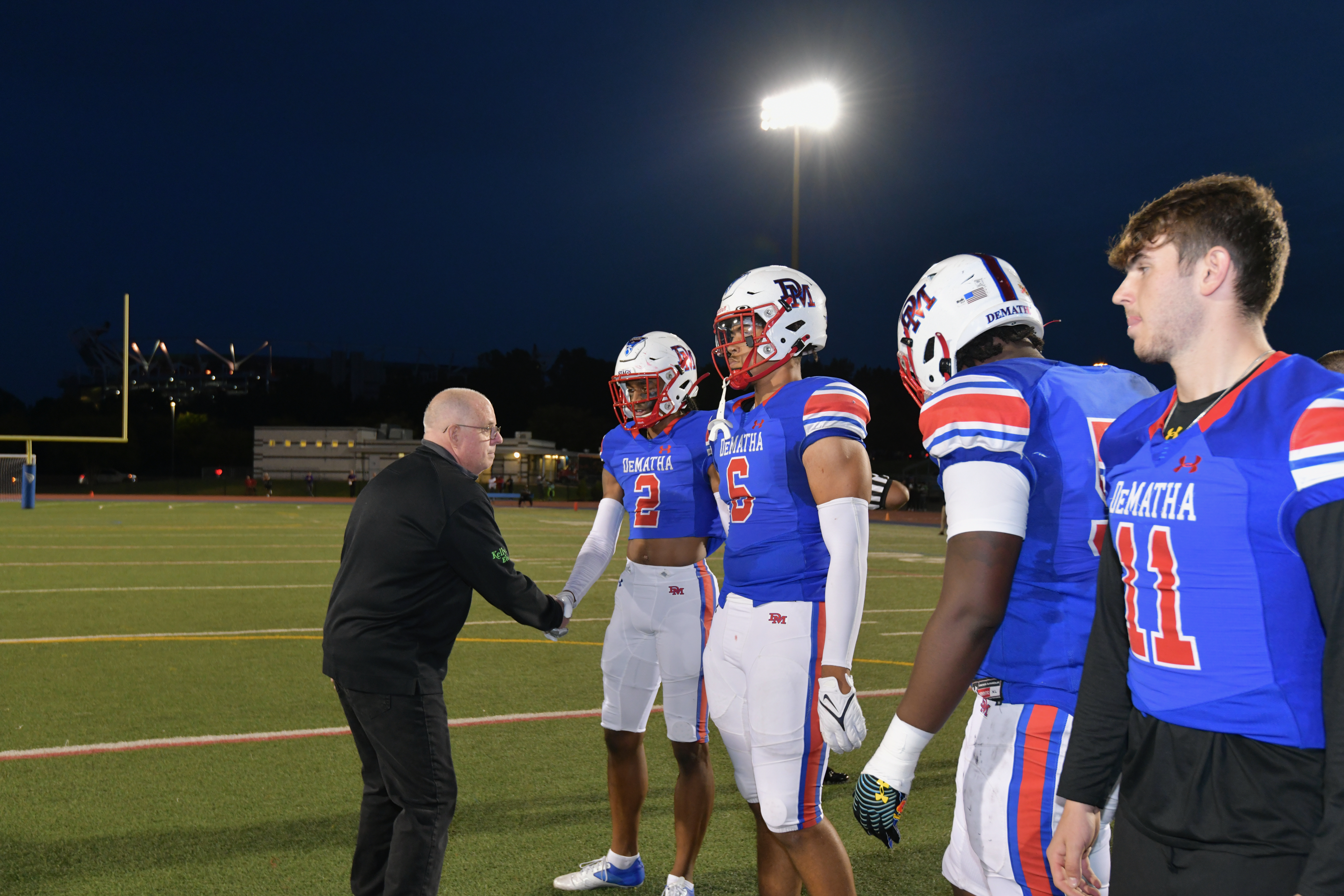
Maryland Gov. Larry Hogan greets DeMatha players at the school's football game against Gonzaga in 2021.

Sports Illustrated recognized DeMatha as the No. 2 high school athletic program in the United States in 2005, and again in 2007.

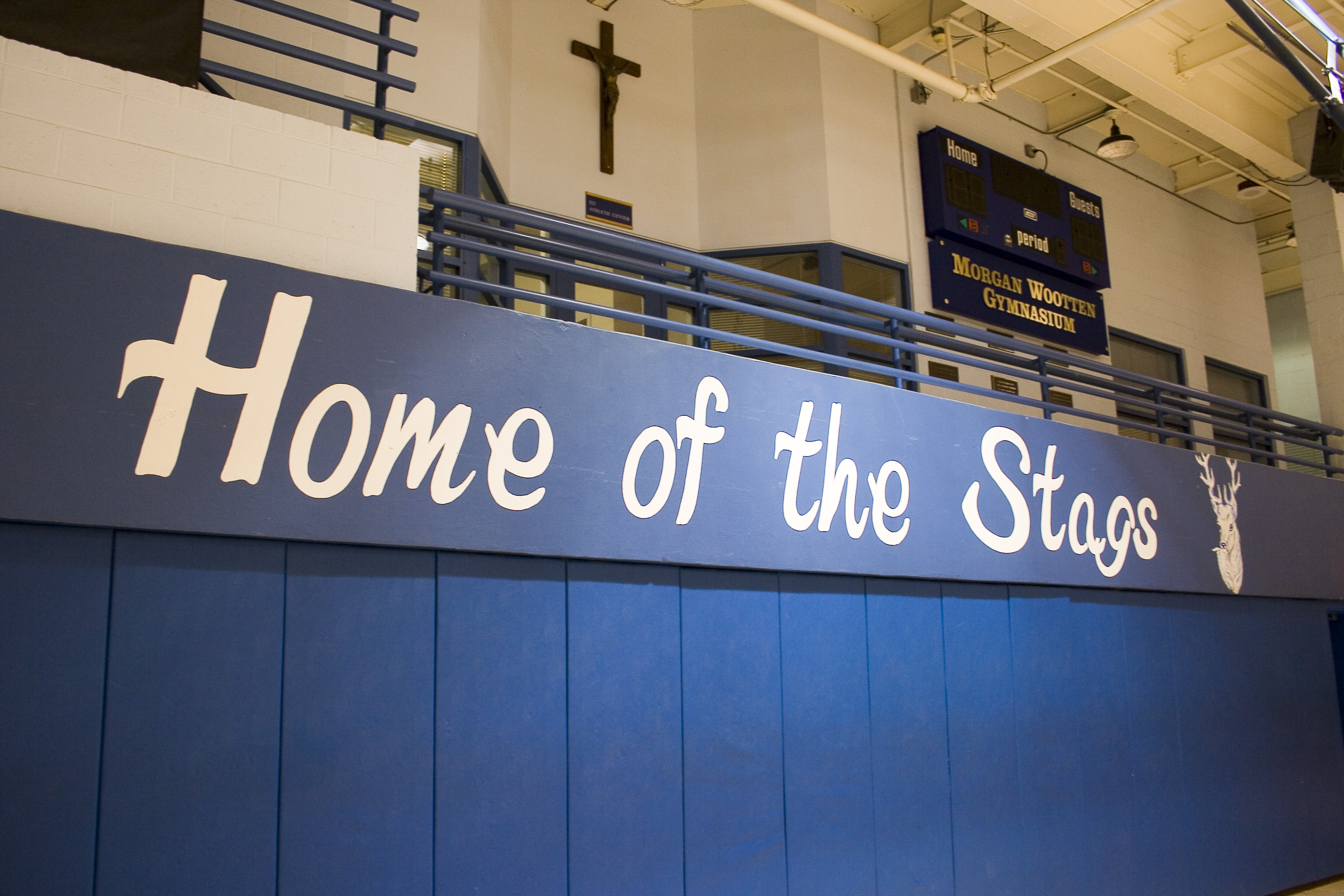
Morgan Wootten Gymnasium

== Notable alumni ==
=== Religious ===
- Sister Susan Rose Francois (1990), known for tweeting a daily non-violent prayer for President Trump, and for Nuns on the Bus.

=== Arts and entertainment ===
- Bob Bates (1971), designer of games for Infocom, Legend Entertainment, and Zynga
- Peter Bay (1974), conductor-music director of the Austin Symphony Orchestra

=== Media ===
- James Brown (1969), television sportscaster, and host of The NFL Today.
- David Aldridge (1983), sports reporter affiliated with television's TNT, and The Philadelphia Inquirer.

=== Politics ===
- Kevin Shea (1972), former acting Secretary of Agriculture (2021). Shea has led the USDA agency Animal Plant Health Inspection Services since 2012.
- David J. Schiappa (1980), Secretary for the Majority in the United States Senate
- Justin Fairfax (1996), politician, attorney, and the former Lieutenant Governor of Virginia.
- Adrian Boafo (2012), politician and member of Maryland House of Delegates

=== Publishing ===
- Michael Mewshaw (1961), American novelist and travel writer.
- Thomas S. Hibbs (1978), American philosopher and author, dean and president of the University of Dallas.
- Jim Nelson (1981), editor, former Editor-in-Chief of GQ magazine.

=== Sports ===
==== Baseball ====
- Steve Farr (1974), former Major League Baseball relief pitcher (1984–1994).
- Matt Swope (1998), college baseball coach for the Maryland Terrapins.
- Brett Cecil (2004), former Major League Baseball pitcher.

==== Basketball ====
- John Austin (1962), former professional basketball player in the NBA (1966–67) and ABA (1967–68).
- Johnny Jones (1962), former professional basketball player for the NBA (1967–68) and ABA (1968–69)
- Joe Kennedy (1964), former professional basketball player for the Seattle SuperSonics and Pittsburgh Condors
- Bernard Williams (1965), former professional basketball player in the NBA and ABA.
- Sid Catlett (1967), former NBA player (1971–72).
- Adrian Dantley (1973), former NBA player (1976–91) and former interim NBA coach.
- Kenny Carr (1974), former NBA player (1977–87), and member of the 1976 gold medal-winning United States Olympics team.
- Charles Whitney (1976), former NBA player for the Kansas City Kings (1980–1982)
- Mike Brey (1977), collegiate basketball coach, formerly the men's head coach for the University of Notre Dame.
- Sidney Lowe (1979), former NBA player and coach. He is a former men's head basketball coach at North Carolina State University.
- Dereck Whittenburg (1979), former men's head basketball coach at Fordham University.
- Ron Everhart (1980), college basketball coach, formerly the head coach at Northeastern University and Duquesne University.
- Adrian Branch (1981), former NBA player (1986–90). He is also a television analyst for basketball.
- Danny Ferry (1985), former NBA player with the Cleveland Cavaliers who won an NBA championship with the San Antonio Spurs.
- Steve Hood (1986), former professional basketball player.
- Jerrod Mustaf (1988), former NBA basketball player (1990–94).
- Kenny Blakeney (1990) is the current head coach of the Howard Bison
- Heath Schroyer (1990) is the former head coach of University of Wyoming.
- Mike Jones (1991) is the current head coach of Old Dominion University and was the head coach of DeMatha from 2002 to 2021.
- Duane Simpkins (1992) is the current head coach for American University
- Mike Pegues (1996) is a former professional basketball player and current college coach.
- Keith Bogans (1999) is a former NBA player (2003–14).
- Joseph Forte (1999) is a former professional basketball player, having played in the NBA and last played for Maccabi Tel Aviv of the Israeli Premier League.
- Jerai Grant (2007) is a professional basketball player in Europe and Australia and played collegiately at Clemson University.
- Jerian Grant (2010) is a professional basketball player for the Orlando Magic and played collegiately at the University of Notre Dame.
- Victor Oladipo (2010) is a professional basketball player who plays for the Houston Rockets and was an All-American at Indiana University.
- Quinn Cook (2011 - transferred) is a professional basketball player who plays for the Sacramento Kings and played collegiately at Duke University.
- Mikael Hopkins (2011) is a professional basketball player who plays for KK Cedevita Olimpija and played collegiate at Georgetown University.
- Kameron Taylor (2011), is a professional basketball player for Maccabi Tel Aviv in the Israeli Basketball Premier League and the EuroLeague
- Jerami Grant (2012) is a professional basketball player who plays for the Portland Trail Blazers and played collegiately at Syracuse University.
- Nate Darling (2016) is a professional basketball player who has played for the Charlotte Hornets and played collegiately at the University of Delaware.
- Markelle Fultz (2016) is a professional basketball player for the Orlando Magic, who was the first pick of the 2017 NBA draft.
- Josh Carlton (2017) is a professional basketball player who plays for Metropolitans 92 in the LNB Pro A and played collegiate basketball for the University of Houston.
- Justin Moore (2019) is an NCAA basketball player who plays at Villanova University.
- Jahmir Young (2019) is an NCAA basketball player who plays at the University of Maryland.
- Hunter Dickinson (2020) is an NCAA basketball player who plays at the University of Kansas.
- Earl Timberlake (2020) is an NCAA basketball player who plays at Bryant University.
- Elijah Hawkins (2021) is an NCAA basketball player who plays at the University of Minnesota
- Jordan Hawkins (2021) is a professional basketball player for the New Orleans Pelicans.

==== Football ====
- Tom Forrest (1969) is a former offensive guard for the NFL's Chicago Bears (1974).
- Jeff Komlo (1975) is a former quarterback for the Detroit Lions.
- Mike Johnson (1980) is a former All-Pro NFL linebacker (1986–1995).
- Tony Paige (1980) is a former NFL player (1984–1992).
- Steve Smith (1982) is a former NFL running back (1987–1995).
- JB Brown (1985) is a former NFL cornerback (1989–99).
- Bobby Houston (1985) is a former NFL linebacker (1990–98).
- Andrew Bayes (1996) is a former All-American punter at East Carolina University.
- Brian Westbrook (1997) is a former running back for the NFL's Philadelphia Eagles (2002–10).
- John Owens (1998) is a former NFL tight end (2002–2010).
- Cameron Wake (2000) is a former defensive end and two-time CFL Defensive Player of the Year.
- Dennard Wilson (2000) is the defensive coordinator for the NFL's Tennessee Titans
- Quinn Ojinnaka (2002) is a former offensive lineman (2006–2012) and now a professional wrestler under the name "Moose" for Impact Wrestling.
- Byron Westbrook (2002) is a former defensive back for the NFL's Washington Redskins (2007–2011).
- Josh Wilson (2003) is a former defensive back for the NFL's Detroit Lions.
- Edwin Williams (2004) is a former offensive lineman for the NFL's Chicago Bears.
- Rodney McLeod (2008) is a safety for the NFL's Philadelphia Eagles.
- Arie Kouandjio (2010) is a former offensive lineman for the NFL's Washington Redskins.
- Cyrus Kouandjio (2011) is a former offensive lineman for the NFL's Denver Broncos.
- Ja'Whaun Bentley (2014), linebacker for the NFL's New England Patriots.
- John Lovett (2014), fullback for the NFL's Miami Dolphins.
- Cam Phillips (2014), wide receiver for the Buffalo Bills
- Tino Ellis (2016), cornerback for the NFL's Miami Dolphins.
- D. J. Turner (2016), wide receiver for the NFL's Las Vegas Raiders
- Anthony McFarland (2017), running back for the NFL's Pittsburgh Steelers
- Olu Oluwatimi (2017), center for the NFL's Seattle Seahawks
- Chase Young (2017), 2020 Heisman Trophy finalist, drafted 2nd overall in the 2020 NFL draft, defensive end for the San Francisco 49ers.
- Nick Cross (2019), safety for the NFL's Indianapolis Colts
- DeMarcco Hellams (2019), safety for the NFL's Atlanta Falcons
- Josh Wallace (2019), cornerback for the NFL's Los Angeles Rams
- Coziah Izzard (2020), defensive tackle for the NFL's New Orleans Saints
- MarShawn Lloyd (2020), running back for the NFL's Green Bay Packers
- Jaden Bradley (2021), wide receiver for the Washington Commanders
- Kevin Winston Jr. (2022), safety for the Penn State Nittany Lions
- Tim Hightower, NFL Runningback, Arizona Cardinals, Washington Redskins

==== Lacrosse ====
- Paul Rabil (2004) is a retired professional lacrosse player and co-founder/president of the Premier Lacrosse League.

==== NASCAR ====
- Coy Gibbs (1991) was a former NASCAR driver, former assistant coach for the Washington Redskins; son of former NFL head coach Joe Gibbs.

==== Soccer ====
- Jordan Graye (2005) is a professional soccer player for the Major League Soccer team Houston Dynamo.
- Drew Yates (2006) is a professional soccer player for the USL Harrisburg City Islanders.
- Bill Hamid (2008) is a professional soccer player for the Major League Soccer team D.C. United.
- Chris Odoi-Atsem (2013) is a professional soccer player for the Major League Soccer team D.C. United.
- Keegan Meyer (2015) is a professional soccer player for USL League One side New England Revolution II.

==== Track and field ====
- Derek Mills (1990) is an Olympic gold medalist in track and field at the 1996 Summer Olympics.
- Caleb Dean (2019) is an NCAA National Champion in the 60m Hurdles and the 400m Hurdles.

== Notable staff ==
- Morgan Wootten is the school's former basketball coach. He coached the team to five national championships and in 2000, was inducted into the Naismith Memorial Basketball Hall of Fame.
- Eddie Fogler was an assistant basketball coach under Wootten for the 1970–1971 school year.
