= Joseph Francois (economist) =

Economist

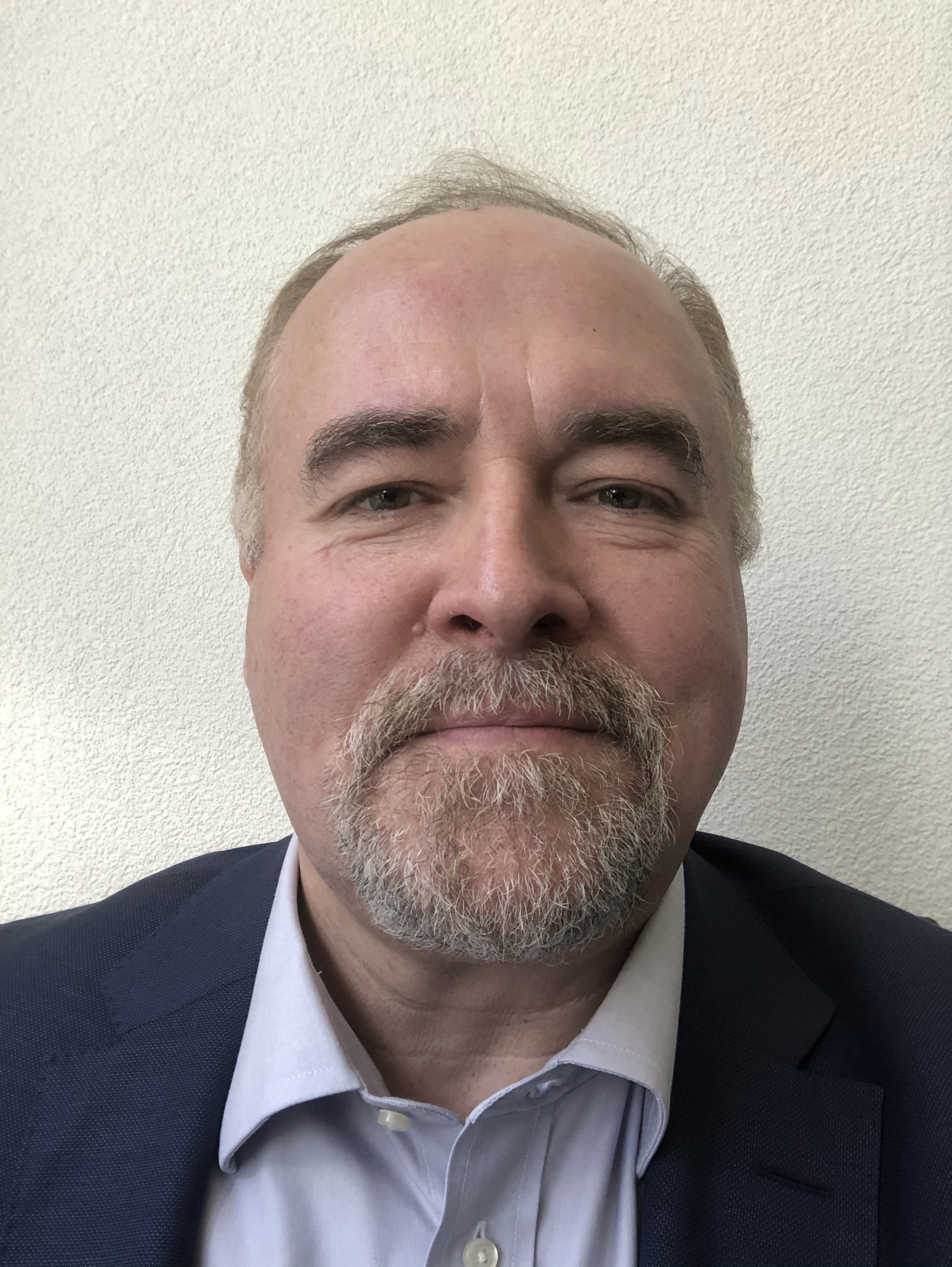
- Born: 1961 (age 64–65); Washington DC, United States of America

Academic background
- Education: University of Maryland
- Doctoral advisor: Arvind Panagariya

Academic work
- Discipline: International Economics
- Institutions: University of Bern, Professor of International Economics, Managing Director World Trade Institute
- Website: Information at IDEAS / RePEc

Notes
Joseph Francois publications indexed by Google Scholar

Joseph Francois is a professor of international economics at the University of Bern, where he has taught since 2013. Since 2015, he is also the managing director of the World Trade Institute. He is co-director of the European Trade Study Group, which he co-founded in 1999. He is a research fellow of the Centre for Economic Policy Research (CEPR) and an at-large board member of the Global Trade Analysis Project (GTAP).

== Research ==
=== Areas of Research ===
He has published on: the role of the service sector in trade, growth and development; regional economic integration; the WTO; and the social and environmental effects (sustainability impacts) of globalization. His research on the economics of services has emphasized linkages between rising complexity in production and the rising share of producer services with growth, a distinct mechanism from the consumption-side productivity trap with consumer services known as Baumol's cost disease. His research also includes computational economics (including quantitative trade policy modeling) as well as the role of regional agreements and the multilateral system in reducing economic policy uncertainty (Note: His study (with Richard Baldwin and Richard Portes) on the Eastern Enlargement of the European Union emphasized the role of adopting the Acquis communautaire in reducing economic policy uncertainty in the East European countries joining the European Union. The study was widely cited in the public policy debate leading up to the 2004 Enlargement.) He also writes on current international economic policy.

=== Selected books ===
- Francois, Joseph F. and Bernard Hoekman, Behind-the-Border Policies: Assessing and Addressing Non-Tariff Measures. Cambridge University Press, 2019. ISBN 9781108485531;
- Pelkmans, Jacques and Joseph Francois, Tomorrow's Silk Road: Assessing an EU-China Free Trade Agreement, CEPS: Brussels, 2016, ISBN 978-1-78660-787-4, 9789461385185;
- Francois, Joseph F., Ganeshan Wignaraja, and Pradumna Bickram Rana. Pan-Asian Integration: Linking East and South Asia. Springer, 2009, ISBN 978-0-230-22178-9;
- Francois, Joseph F., and Clinton R. Shiells, eds. Modeling trade policy: applied general equilibrium assessments of North American free trade. Cambridge University Press, 2008, ISBN 978-0521450034;
- Baldwin, Richard E., and Joseph F. Francois, eds. Dynamic Issues in Commercial Policy Analysis. Cambridge University Press, 1999. ISBN 978-0521159517;
- Reinert, Kenneth A., and Joseph F. Francois, eds. Applied methods for trade policy analysis: A handbook. Cambridge University Press, 1997. ISBN 9780521589970.

== Early life and education ==
He was born in Washington DC in 1961, and is the oldest of 5 children (Joseph, Marie, Michael, Monica, and Susan). He is the son of Francis Francois and Eileen Schmelzer. He was raised in Bowie, Maryland and attended St. John's College High School. He received his PhD from the University of Maryland in 1988, after receiving a B.A. with distinction in both economics and in history from the University of Virginia (UVA) in 1982 and an M.A. in economics from UVA in 1983.

== Career ==
He worked as economist at the U.S. Bureau of Labor Statistics from 1983 to 1987. He then moved to the US International Trade Commission, where from 1987 to 1993 he started as a research economist and later became Chief of Research (at the age of 28), and then acting director of Economics with the USITC. While at the USITC he was co-director of the 1992 USITC assessment of the NAFTA, He was a research economist with the GATT/WTO from 1993 to 1996, where he coordinated the GATT secretariat economic assessment of the Uruguay Round at the end of the Round. From 1996 to 2007 he was full Professor of International Economics at Erasmus University Rotterdam and research fellow of the Tinbergen Institute. He moved to Austria in 2007 as Professor of Economics at the Johannes Kepler University Linz from 2007 to 2013. He took a chair in international economics at the University of Bern in 2013, and became managing director of the World Trade Institute in 2015. He consults for governments and international organisations, and periodically advises on the negotiation and impact of trade and investment agreements.

== Awards and recognition ==
He was awarded the title of GTAP research fellow for significant model and data contributions, and serves as one of three at large members on the board of the Global Trade Analysis Project. He received periodic top researcher awards from Erasmus University, an Austrian Champions in European Research award from the Austrian Research Promotion Agency, and numerous research grants from the European Commission and Swiss National Science Funds. He also served on the Zedillo Committee on Global Trade and Financial Architecture. He serves on the editorial board of the Journal of Global Economic Analysis and the World Trade Review. He is a research fellow of the Centre for Economic Policy Research. (CEPR)

== Notes ==
Notice: This page re-uses biographic content from the University of Bern World Trade Institute, https://www.wti.org/institute/people/432/francois-joseph/ which is itself free for public use under the GNU Free Documentation License. The contents of this page are therefore subject to the same conditions under the "GNU Free Documentation License." http://www.gnu.org/licenses/fdl.html
