= Seed-based d mapping =

Statistical technique for meta-analyzing studies in brain activity

Seed-based d mapping (formerly Signed differential mapping) or SDM is a statistical technique created by Joaquim Radua for meta-analysis studies assessing differences in brain activity or structure via neuroimaging techniques such as fMRI, VBM, DTI or PET. It may also refer to a specific piece of software created by the SDM Project to carry out such meta-analyses.

== The seed-based d mapping approach ==
=== Overview of the method ===
SDM adopted and combined various positive features from previous methods, such as ALE or MKDA, and introduced a series of improvements and novel features. One of the new features, introduced to avoid positive and negative findings in the same voxel as seen in previous methods, was the representation of both positive differences and negative differences in the same map, thus obtaining a signed differential map (SDM). Another relevant feature, introduced in version 2.11, was the use of effect sizes (leading to effect-size SDM or 'ES-SDM'), which allows combination of reported peak coordinates with statistical parametric maps, thus allowing more exhaustive and accurate meta-analyses.

The method has three steps. First, coordinates of cluster peaks (e.g. the voxels where the differences between patients and healthy controls were highest), and statistical maps if available, are selected according to SDM inclusion criteria. Second, coordinates are used to recreate statistical maps, and effect-sizes maps and their variances are derived from t-statistics (or equivalently from p-values or z-scores). Finally, individual study maps are meta-analyzed using different tests to complement the main outcome with sensitivity and heterogeneity analyses.

=== Inclusion criteria ===
It is not uncommon in neuroimaging studies that some regions (e.g. a priori regions of interest) are more liberally thresholded than the rest of the brain. However, a meta-analysis of studies with such intra-study regional differences in thresholds would be biased towards these regions, as they are more likely to be reported just because authors apply more liberal thresholds in them. In order to overcome this issue SDM introduced a criterion in the selection of the coordinates: while different studies may employ different thresholds, you should ensure that the same threshold throughout the whole brain was used within each included study.

=== Pre-processing of studies ===
After conversion of statistical parametric maps and peak coordinates to Talairach space, an SDM map is created for each study within a specific gray or white matter template. Pre-processing of statistical parametric maps is straightforward, while pre-processing of reported peak coordinates requires recreating the clusters of difference by means of an un-normalized Gaussian Kernel, so that voxels closer to the peak coordinate have higher values. A rather large full-width at half-maximum (FWHM) of 20mm is used to account for different sources of spatial error, e.g. coregistration mismatch in the studies, the size of the cluster or the location of the peak within the cluster. Within a study, values obtained by close Gaussian kernels are summed, though values are combined by square-distance-weighted averaging.

=== Statistical comparisons ===
SDM provides several different statistical analyses in order to complement the main outcome with sensitivity and heterogeneity analyses.

- The main statistical analysis is the mean analysis, which consists in calculating the mean of the voxel values in the different studies. This mean is weighted by the inverse of the variance and accounts for inter-study heterogeneity (QH maps).
- Subgroup analyses are mean analyses applied to groups of studies to allow the study of heterogeneity.
- Linear model analyses (e.g. meta-regression) are a generalization of the mean analysis to allow comparisons between groups and the study of possible confounds. A low variability of the regressor is critical in meta-regressions, so they are recommended to be understood as exploratory and to be more conservatively thresholded.
- Jack-knife analysis consists in repeating a test as many times as studies have been included, discarding one different study each time, i.e. removing one study and repeating the analyses, then putting that study back and removing another study and repeating the analysis, and so on. The idea is that if a significant brain region remains significant in all or most of the combinations of studies it can be concluded that this finding is highly replicable.

The statistical significance of the analyses is checked by standard randomization tests. It is recommended to use uncorrected p-values = 0.005, as this significance has been found in this method to be approximately equivalent to a corrected p-value = 0.05. A false discovery rate (FDR) = 0.05 has been found in this method to be too conservative. Values in a Talairach label or coordinate can also be extracted for further processing or graphical presentation.

== SDM software ==
SDM is software written by the SDM project to aid the meta-analysis of voxel-based neuroimaging data. It is distributed as freeware including a graphical interface and a menu/command-line console. It can also be integrated as an SPM extension.
