= Peter Dixon (disambiguation) =

Peter Dixon (1944–2023) was an English rugby union player.

Peter Dixon may also refer to:

- Peter Dixon (economist) (born 1946), Australian economist
- Peter Dixon, chief scout of Catholic Boy Scouts of Ireland, 1998–2004
- Pete Dixon, character on Room 222 television series

== See also ==
- Peter Dickson (disambiguation)
- Pieter Dixon (born 1977), Zimbabwean-born South African rugby union footballer
