= NETWORK Lobby =

Catholic social justice lobby

NETWORK Lobby for Catholic Social Justice is a national Catholic social justice lobby founded in 1971 and headquartered in Washington, D.C. The organization focuses its lobbying efforts in the areas of economic justice, immigration reform, healthcare, peace making and ecology.

Sr Simone Campbell, SSS was executive director of NETWORK from November 2004 to March 2021. She was succeeded by Mary Novak.

== History ==
Network was founded in December 1971 when 47 Catholic sisters involved in education, healthcare, and other direct service activities gathered from across the U.S. at Trinity College in Washington, D.C., with the intent to form a new type of justice ministry. The Catholic Church was undergoing dramatic changes in response to Vatican II reforms and calls from the Vatican and U.S. Bishops to seek "Justice in the World". Individual women religious orders had already become involved in the Civil Rights Movement, and anti-war activism.

In April 1972, the group opened an office in Washington, D.C. They sponsored legislative seminars that attracted many notable participants and presenters including prominent Members of Congress (e.g., Senators Ted Kennedy, Adlai Stevenson, Barbara Mikulski, Walter Mondale and Joseph Biden) and Catholic notables such as Fr. Bryan Hehir.

In January 2001, President Bill Clinton presented the Presidential Citizens Medal, the U.S.'s second highest civilian honor, to a Network founder and first executive director, Sister Carol Coston. She was the first Catholic nun ever to receive this award.

=== Obamacare ===
In 2010, during the 2010 healthcare reform debate, lawyer and the executive director of Network, Simone Campbell a member of the Sisters of Social Service, wrote the "nuns' letter" supporting the bill. The letter had 55 signatories, including the president of the Leadership Conference of Women Religious and several leadership teams of women's orders. On March 18, 2010, Sr. Simone Campbell was interviewed by NPR about Network's support of the then pending U.S. national health care bill, when she, along with "heads of dozens of religious orders" signed a letter to congress urging passage. Network circulated the letter to the various heads of the orders and asked them to sign.

Ann Carey, author of Sister in Crisis, takes issue with the claim that those signing the letter represented over 50,000 religious sisters. Said Carey, "I have heard from many women religious who asked me to make it clear in my writing that such sisters do not represent them, and those prominent sisters have no right to speak for all sisters."

President Barack Obama invited Campbell to the ceremony celebrating the bill being signed into law. The Network group was credited with being a significant force in the passage of the bill into law.

=== Pope Benedict XVI ===
On April 18, 2012, the Vatican's Congregation for the Doctrine of the Faith under Pope Benedict XVI issued a report criticizing the Leadership Conference of Women Religious, a group that represents the vast majority of the 57,000 nuns in the U.S. The report explicitly cited NETWORK as being a particularly negative influence. In response to the criticism, U.S. Vice President Joe Biden, a lifelong Catholic, defended NETWORK and its activism.

The report, which specifically accused NETWORK of focusing too much on the social justice mission of the church, was released without NETWORK being notified in advance that anything was amiss. Noted Campbell: "The sweeping condemnation came like a bolt out of the blue—it even took the American bishops by surprise—and it came without the courtesy of input or a response from our organization."

However, unlike LCWR, NETWORK is independent of the Vatican and was thus able to continue its mission unencumbered. In response to the "blistering critique" they received, NETWORK created the "Nuns on the Bus" program, which The New York Times called a "spirited retort to the Vatican."

== Nuns on the Bus ==
Network sponsors Nuns on the Bus. Led by Sister Simone Campbell, they place emphasis on the church's long-standing commitment to social justice. A small group of nuns travel on a dedicated bus inside the United States publicizing different issues. In 2012, the Nuns aimed to draw attention to nuns’ work with the poor and to protest against planned aid cuts.

In 2013, the Network partnered with self-described "strategy center" "Faith in Public Life" to promote the theme of immigration reform. FPL was founded in 2005 "to advance a positive alternative" after "decades of political dominance by the Religious Right". FPL "played an integral role in planning and executing the 'Nuns on the Border' bus tour".
