= Armington =

Armington as a personal name can refer to:

- Frank Armington (1876–1941), Canadian artist
- Mariano Laya Armington
- Paul Armington, economist

Armington as a place name can refer to:

- Armington, Illinois

Armington as an economic term can refer to:

- Armington elasticity
