= Joaquim Radua =

Spanish psychiatrist

- Education: Autonomous University of Barcelona; King's College London
- Scientific career
- Fields: Psychiatry, Meta-analysis and Neuroimaging

Joaquim Radua is a Spanish psychiatrist and developer of methods for meta-analysis of neuroimaging studies. He has been named as one of the most cited researchers in Psychiatry / Psychology.

== Education ==
Joaquim Radua studied Medicine as well as Statistics at the Autonomous University of Barcelona and graduated in 2003 and 2010 respectively. He did his residency training at the Hospital Universitari of Bellvitge (Barcelona) and became a specialist in Psychiatry in 2008. He subsequently received his PhD in biostatistics of brain imaging at King's College London. He conducted a Río Hortega Research Training Program in 2013. He also conducted a postdoctoral stay at Yale University.

== Career ==
=== Research focus/interests ===
He has developed several meta-analytic and neuroimaging methods. MetaNSUE and Seed-based d mapping (formerly Signed Differential Mapping, SDM) methods must be highlighted for their applicability and becoming software most used by the scientific community at the present time. He also conducts studies on evidence-based personalized medicine, specially focusing on clinical prediction (e.g. assessing the risk of recurrence for each individual) based on available clinical and biological.

=== Awards ===
Radua has been named a Highly Cited Researcher by Clarivate Analytics, ranking among top 1% of researchers for most cited documents in Psychiatry / Psychology.

=== Present appointments ===
Dr. Joaquim Radua leads the Imaging of Mood- and Anxiety-Related Disorders group at IDIBAPS–Hospital Clínic de Barcelona and is a full professor at the University of Barcelona. Beyond research, he teaches psychiatry in the Degree in Medicine program as well as several postgraduate courses in statistics and neuroimaging.

=== Positions of trust/research assessments ===
He is on the editorial board of a range of international scientific journals including frontiers in Psychiatry and BioMed Research International, and regularly reviews articles for many others. He is the current president of the Spanish Neuroimaging Society.

=== Publications ===
Radua has published more than 100 articles His h-index is 59 and has over 5386 citations (Google Scholar).

Selected publications:

- Voxel-wise meta-analysis of grey matter changes in obsessive-compulsive disorder .
- Meta-analytical comparison of voxel-based morphometry studies in obsessive-compulsive disorder vs other anxiety disorders .
- Gray matter volume abnormalities in ADHD: voxel-based meta-analysis exploring the effects of age and stimulant medication .
- Meta-analysis of functional magnetic resonance imaging studies of inhibition and attention in attention-deficit/hyperactivity disorder: exploring task-specific, stimulant medication, and age effects .
- Effects of stimulants on brain function in attention-deficit/hyperactivity disorder: a systematic review and meta-analysis.
- Fractionating theory of mind: a meta-analysis of functional brain imaging studies.
- Ventral striatal activation during reward processing in psychosis: a neurofunctional meta-analysis.
- Neural signatures of human fear conditioning: an updated and extended meta-analysis of fMRI studies.
