= Deborah A. Cobb-Clark =

Australian economist

Deborah Ann Cobb-Clark AO FASSA is an Australian economist. She is currently working as a Professor in the University of Sydney and as a Chief Investigator in the ARC Centre of Excellence for Children and Families over the Life Course. She has also worked in Bonn, Germany at the Institute for the Study of Labor (IZA) since 2000, where she holds the position of director of the Program in Gender and Families.

== Education and work ==
Deborah Cobb-Clark graduated with a Bachelor of Arts degree in economics from Michigan State University, in 1983. In 1986, she got her Master of Arts in economics from the University of Michigan, where four years later, in 1990, she graduated from with a Ph.D. also in economics.

Cobb-Clark started her career at the University of Melbourne as the Ronald Henderson Professor and Director of the Melbourne Institute of Applied Economic and Social Research. She later founded the Social Policy Evaluation, Analysis and Research Centre (SPEAR) at the Australian National University. Over the years, she held positions such as teacher assistant at the Illinois State University and labor economist at the US Department of Labor. She is currently an economic Professor in the University of Sydney, a chief investigator at the Centre of Excellence for Children and Families over the Life Course, and director of the Program in Gender and Families at the Institute for the Study of Labor, IZA.

== Research ==
Cobb-Clark’s interests and areas of specialization focus on how the labour market is affected by social policies. She concentrates her research on the effects that such policies have on education, immigration, youth transitions, retirement, sexual and racial discrimination and health.

=== Youth transitions ===
Cobb-Clark's aim in this research is to help implement policies in Australia to help disadvantaged youth by creating a norm to identify youth at risk.

In her paper "The capacity of families to support young Australians: financial transfers from parents, co-residence and youth outcomes", the data collected reveals that modern youth are increasingly dependent on their parents for money, education, and life choices as the public sector offers little support to children. The research finds that families' tendencies to make use of income support tools is related to their children's education and employment. Children from families in need of income support are less likely to receive money from their parent and be part-time employees but more likely to be unemployed. However, no correlation has been found between a family's economic state and the children's enrolment in academic institutions.

Furthermore, the analysis of her article "Intergenerational Disadvantage: Learning about Equal Opportunity from Social Assistance Receipt" shows a link between the kids and the parents' need of social assistance: children coming from families that require social assistance are, in turn, more likely to be in need of social assistance in their future. This correlation is even stronger in minority families, single parent families, and vulnerable families.

=== Health ===
Cobb-Clark focuses on mental health's impacts on work productivity to find the correlation between mental health and diminishing productivity as well as absenteeism in order to create policies that would help increase the yield at work of people with mental illnesses.

Deborah Cobb-Clark, along with Melisa Bubonya and Mark Wooden, explore the impacts of mental health on productivity in their paper "Mental Health and Productivity at Work: Does What You Do Matter?". The findings showed a lower rate of work attendance for people with a reported mental health illnesses. The work environment, including job security, complexity of the tasks, and work-related stress, impacts people with goof mental health differently than it impacts people with poor mental health. In fact, high job security is related to high work absences in women with good mental health as opposed to women with poor mental health. Also, stress and complexity of work seem to have little effect on people with poor mental health's decision to show up to work.

Furthermore, in the paper "The Bilateral Relationship between Depressive Symptoms and Employment Status", Cobb-Clark and Bubonya find that mental illnesses such as depression affect labour productivity, but that the truth also holds for the inverse causality: inability to find work can lead to depressive episodes and mental illnesses on the long-run.

== Awards and honours ==
- In the Top 10% female economists in 2019
- Second highest ranked female economist in Australia
- 2018 Distinguished Fellow of the Australian Economic Society Award
- 2009 Elected Fellow of the Academy of the Social Sciences in Australia
- 2024 Appointed Officer of the Order of Australia

== Selected bibliography and works ==
- Cobb-Clark, D. (2018). Biology and Gender in the Labor Market. In Averett, Susan L.; Argys, Laura M. and Hoffman, Saul D. (Eds.), The Oxford Handbook of Women and the Economy, (pp. 1–30). Oxford: Oxford Handbooks Online.
- Cobb-Clark, D., Salamanca, N., Zhu, A. (2018). Parenting style as an investment in human development. Journal of Population Economics, In Press.
- Cobb-Clark, D., Bubonya, M., Ribar, D. (2017). The Bilateral Relationship between Depressive Symptoms and Employment Status.
- Bubonya, M., Cobb-Clark, D., Wooden, M. (2016). Mental Health and Productivity at Work: Does What You Do Matter?, No. 2016-6 April 2016, (pp. 1–56). Indooroopilly, Australia: The University of Queensland.
- Cobb - Clark, D., Gorgens, T. (2013). Occasional Paper No. 45 - The capacity of families to support young Australians: financial transfers from parents, co-residence and youth outcomes, Occasional Paper No. 45, (pp. 1–64). Canberra, Australia: Department of Families, Housing, Community Services and Indigenous Affairs.
