= Francis B. Francois =

American engineer and lawyer (1934–2021)

Francis Bernard Francois
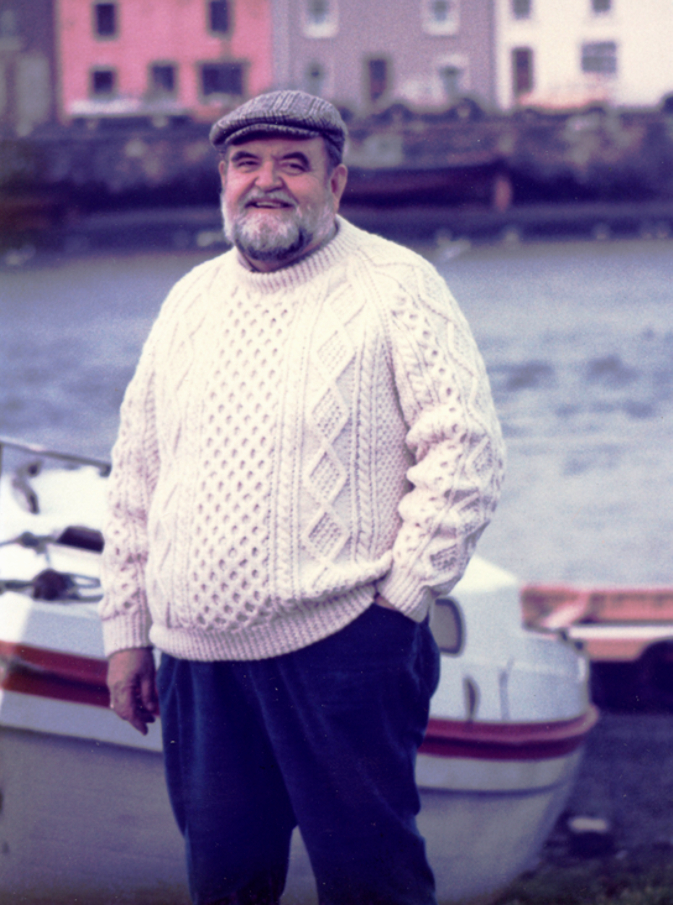
- Born: January 21, 1934; Barnum, Iowa, U.S.
- Died: February 17, 2021 (aged 87); Chicago, Illinois, U.S.
- Education: Iowa State University, George Washington University
- Known for: Transportation, Engineering and Policy Leadership in Surface Transportation Infrastructure and Research
- Awards: W.N. Carey Jr. Award, Theodore M. Matson Memorial Award, Marston Medal, Frank Turner Medal, ARTBA Top 100 Professionals in the U.S. in the 20th Century, Washingtonian of the Year
- Scientific career
- Fields: Engineering, Elected Official, Judge, Law
- Workplaces: AASHTO, Prince George's County, Maryland

Francis Bernard Francois (January 21, 1934 – February 17, 2021) was an American engineer and lawyer who received recognition for his achievements in the field of engineering and policy leadership in regional government, surface transportation infrastructure and research. In 1999, he was elected to the National Academy of Engineering.

== Career ==
Francois grew up on a farm in Barnum, Webster County, Iowa and graduated from Iowa State University with a bachelor's degree in engineering in 1956. He moved to Washington, D.C. and began his career in 1956 as a patent examiner in the U.S. Patent Office. He enrolled in night law school at The George Washington University, and earned a law degree in 1960. Francois become a patent advisor for the Applied Physics Laboratory at Johns Hopkins University in 1959. He was admitted to the Maryland bar in 1960, and practiced patent and trademark law with the firm of Bacon and Thomas from 1962 until 1980.

=== Prince George's County ===
Francois became an elected official in Prince George's County, Maryland, in 1962, serving first as Chief Judge of the Orphan's Court, then a County Commissioner. After the county changed from a County Commissioner to a County Council system, he served 10 years as a member of the County Council. There his special interests included civil rights legislation, fair employment for African Americans, education, problems of the handicapped and senior citizens, fiscal management, recreation and economic and community development. When he announced that he would not run for County Executive in the 1978 Democratic primary, The Washington Post noted Francois as the council's "philosopher historian", "maverick" and "ambassador to the outside world".

Francois represented Prince George's County on the Metropolitan Washington Council of Governments (COG) and the Washington Metropolitan Area Transit Authority (WMATA) and he chaired the Joint Policy Steering Committee on the Washington Metro Alternatives Analysis Project. With COG he supported and helped coordinate the D.C. Air Pollution Act in 1968, which predated national air quality legislation by several years; he was present for the signing of the bill alongside President Lyndon B. Johnson and Washington DC's first mayor, Walter Washington.

Nationally, he was twice elected president of the National Association of Regional Councils and in 1979–1980 was president of the National Association of Counties (NACo). With NACo he advocated for the role of county government in policy briefings with President Jimmy Carter and said in his inauguration speech as NACo president: "From this day forward, let us never speak of county government as being anything less than the most meaningful and effective form of local government in America, for that is precisely what we are." He concluded that message with a tip to his Irish ancestry, offering an old Irish blessing to the NACo audience.

=== AASHTO ===
In 1980, he resigned from the County Council to become executive director of the American Association of State Highway and Transportation Officials (AASHTO), where he remained until his retirement in 1999. AASHTO said that in his application letter for the executive director's job, Francois wrote: "Never before in history has transportation been more important than in the America of the late 20th century. Our economy, our life-style, the design of our urban and rural areas, and indeed our very survival as a modern nation are all dependent on us having a good transportation system."

He assumed the duties as AASHTO's executive director at a time when the association faced new and daunting challenges with respect to maintaining the nation's multi-modal transportation network. During his nearly 20-year tenure as AASHTO executive director, Francois reasserted the association as the premier technical organization for adopting and issuing highway standards and specifications. He also strengthened its role with respect to setting national transportation policy for all modes, and played a major role in four legislative reauthorization efforts (1981, 1986, 1991, 1996) under the administrations of President Ronald Reagan, President George H. W. Bush and President Bill Clinton. He was an important player in the Washington, D.C., debates over transportation policy and helped marshal state departments of transportation activities to push for several major highway and transit bills, capped by the 1998 Transportation Equity Act for the 21st Century, or TEA-21. Francois also further cultivated AASHTO's involvement in international activities, working with global transportation organizations such as the International Road Federation and the World Road Association. He co-led the Scanning Tour on Transportation Agency Organization and Management sponsored by AASHTO, the U.S. Federal Highway Administration (FHWA), and industry; the tour included meetings with transport agencies in New Zealand, Australia, Sweden, and England.

=== Other work ===
In addition to leading AASHTO, Francois supported the transportation profession in many ways, advocating for innovation with the Strategic Highway Research Program (SHRP), and serving on the executive committee of the Transportation Research Board (TRB). Francois was also one of the cofounders of Intelligent Transportation Study of America (ITS America), where he served a term as its chair and was made an honorary life member of its board. Francois also served on the board of directors of Cambridge Systematics Inc from 2000 to 2010.

Upon Francois' retirement, an announcement from FHWA said "Frank was an unflagging advocate for transportation research and technology innovation" explaining, "From the moment SHRP was first envisioned and at every milestone throughout its research and implementation phases, Frank was there. To many people, Frank was SHRP."

== Awards and honors ==
In 1973, Francois was recognized by Washingtonian Magazine as a Washingtonian of the Year. In 1989, Francois received TRB's W.N. Carey Jr. Award for his leadership in supporting transportation research. In 1993, he received the Institute of Transportation Engineers Theodore M. Matson Memorial Award. He was elected to the National Academy of Engineering in 1999. He was also made an honorary lifetime member of the Institute of Transportation Engineers in 2002, which noted at the time that, "Frank's ability to see both sides of an issue – and to issue a verdict that withstands scrutiny – has made him a treasured leader." In 2003, he received the Marston Medal from Iowa State University. In 2004, he was named by the American Road and Transportation Builders Association as one of the top 100 private-sector design and construction professionals in the U.S. in the 20th Century. In 2007, Francois was the recipient of TRB's Frank Turner Medal for Lifetime Achievement in Transportation.

On February 4, 1999, U.S. Congressman Steny Hoyer honored Francois in the Congressional Record citing his reputation as "Mr. Goodwrench," "Mr. Fixit", and having "the vision of an allpurpose reformer."

In 2000, AASHTO created the Francis B. Francois Award for Innovation – an award bestowed annually to state departments of transportation that have developed innovative projects.

In September 2021, his alma mater Iowa State University inducted Francois into the Hall of Fame at the Department of Civil, Construction & Environmental Engineering. He was one of 26 inductees at the CCEE department's 150th anniversary on campus in Ames, Iowa.

== Patents and basketball ==
Francois was the patent attorney for two boyhood friends, Paul D. Estlund and Kenneth F. Estlund, who received U.S. Patent 4,534,556 for a break-away basketball goal, filed in 1977. He wrote a book about the experience of acquiring the patent for the invention that saved many basketball courts from having broken backboards or bent rims. The invention also likely made it easier for the NCAA to decide on the re-introduction of the slam dunk as a legal move in college basketball, after it had been banned in 1967.

Many claim the no dunk rule was implemented to keep Kareem Abdul-Jabbar from dominating the college game, but coach John Wooden said, in an interview to the UCLA student daily paper, "(Alcindor) didn't cause the change. The NCAA Rules Committee outlawed the dunk because of hanging on the rim, rims bending back, boards breaking and glass down." With the advent of the break-away basketball goal, this was no longer an issue.

== Written works ==
- Francois, Francis B. (2008). Two Guys From Barnum, Iowa And How They Helped Save Basketball. Francois Press. ISBN 978-0-6151-8342-8.
- Francois, Francis B. (2011). Me? I'm from Iowa. Lulu Press. ISBN 978-1-1052-5880-0.

== Personal life ==
Francois was married to his wife Eileen Mary Francois for 43 years, before her death in 2003. Together they had five children Joseph, Marie, Michael, Monica and Susan. In 2011 Francois documented his early years growing up on a farm in Barnum Iowa, Webster County as well as his move to the Washington, D.C. metro area, and dedicated his memoir to his wife, 5 children, and 7 grandchildren saying: "Nothing in my life means more to me than these people, and my memoirs are dedicated to them."
