= Peter Dickson =

Peter or Pete Dickson may refer to:

- Peter Dickson (historian) (1929–2021), British historian
- Peter Dickson (announcer) (born 1957), Northern Irish television announcer and voice-over artist
- Peter Dickson (footballer) (born 1951), Scottish footballer
- Peter Dickson (rower) (1945–2008), Australian rower who competed in the 1968 Summer Olympics
- Pete Dickson, musician in Mother Goose (band)

== See also ==
- Peter Dixon (disambiguation)
