= Duncan S. Ironmonger =

Australian economist (1931–2024)

Duncan Standon Ironmonger AM
- Born: 12 October 1931; Orange, New South Wales, Australia
- Died: 3 September 2024 (aged 92)

Academic background
- Education: University of Melbourne; University of Cambridge
- Website: Information at IDEAS / RePEc

Duncan Standon Ironmonger AM (12 October 1931 – 3 September 2024) was an Australian household economist. He was an Honorary Principal Fellow and Associate Professor of the Households Research Unit, Department of Economics, University of Melbourne.

Ironmonger was born in Orange, New South Wales, and finished his schooling at Canberra Grammar School. He worked for the Australian Bureau of Statistics, then studied at the University of Cambridge. He returned to the ABS to contribute to the creation of a system for reporting the national accounts, then worked at the Melbourne Institute of Applied Economic and Social Research.

In 2013, he was made a Member of the Order of Australia.

Ironmonger died on 3 September 2024, at the age of 92.
