= Susan Rose Francois =

American Roman Catholic nun

- Born: 1972 (age 53–54); Washington, D.C., U.S.
- Education: DeMatha Catholic High School; Lewis & Clark College
- Organization: The Sisters of St. Joseph of Peace
- Father: Francis Francois

Susan Rose Francois is a perpetually professed Roman Catholic sister of the order of the Sisters of St. Joseph of Peace. She is an author, columnist, and blogger on religious life and social justice. She has been active in the Nuns on the Bus movement, and came to the attention of mainstream media because of her daily practice of tweeting a prayer to U.S. President Donald Trump.

== Life ==
Susan Francois was born in Washington, D.C. in 1972. She is the youngest of 5 children (Joseph, Marie, Michael, Monica, and Susan). Her father Francis Francois was a local politician in Bowie, Maryland focused on a mix of social and transportation planning issues, and her mother Eileen Schmelzer was a social worker supporting the local population of prisoners and their families. She was raised in Bowie and attended primary and secondary schools in the Archdiocese of Washington, graduating from DeMatha Catholic High School, before attending Lewis & Clark College in Portland, Oregon, graduating in 1994. She worked for the city of Portland for 11 years before then joining the Sisters of St Joseph of Peace in 2006. She later received a Master of Theology degree from the Chicago-based Catholic Theological Union. She is the grand niece of Sister Rose Francois, FSPA, a prominent 19th Century American nun. She was elected to Congregation Leadership Team of her religious community in 2015 and currently serves as the Assistant Congregation Leader of the Sisters of St. Joseph of Peace.

After joining the Sisters of St Joseph of Peace in 2006, she took her final vows in 2011. Her ministry includes social justice and the fight against human trafficking, which she carries out through a mix of action, her writings, and social media (including her blogging and her daily prayer for President Trump.)

“I have no conception that he reads them. I'm not sending them to his personal account. I'm sending them to the POTUS account. And the reason for that is I in my theological studies studied the theology of resistance as an ethical response. And I know that the POTUS account is archived, theoretically. And so I really want that as a record of history. So I'm not sending it to aggravate him, to attend to him. I don't think people need to know that you're praying for them for them to feel it. It's more just to hold me accountable and to be public in that act of love.”
Sister Susan Rose, Interview on National Public Radio

== Publications ==
=== Books ===
- Francois, Susan Rose (2018). "Religious Life in a Time of Fog". In Mosseau, Juliet; Kohles, Susan (eds.). Our Own Words: Religious Life in a Changing World. Liturgical Press.
- Francois, Susan Rose (2021). My Friend Joe: Reflections on St. Joseph. ISBN 978-1-304-35402-0.
- Francois, Susan Rose; Mousseau, Juliet, eds. (2024-11-04). Reseeding Religious Life through Global Sisterhood. Liturgical Press. ISBN 9780814689004.

=== Columns ===
- Contributor to Global Sisters Report
