= Nuns on the Bus =

American Catholic advocacy group

Nuns on the Bus is a Catholic advocacy group in the United States. Their name comes from the fact that they tour the country on a bus.

Led by Sister Simone Campbell, they place emphasis on the Church's long-standing commitment to social justice. In different years, the nuns have tackled different themes. In 2012, the nuns aimed to draw attention to nuns' work with the poor and to protest planned aid cuts. In 2013, the theme was immigration reform. The nuns' journeys are sponsored by NETWORK.

== Doctrine ==
The Nuns on the Bus were at one time criticized by the Vatican under Benedict XVI's leadership for having "serious doctrinal problems" and "radical feminist themes incompatible with the Catholic faith." When American religious sisters were under investigation by the Vatican, the International Union of Superiors General, in contrast, issued a strong statement of support for U.S. women religious congregations. The IUSG praised American women religious for living up to the directives and spirit of the Second Vatican Council. Unlike U.S. bishops at that time, the Nuns on the Bus group was supportive of national health care legislation known as Obamacare. Simone Campbell was one of the American nuns targeted by then Pope Benedict XVI in 2012 through his controversial investigation of the Leadership Conference of Women Religious. The Vatican investigators accused the American nuns of insufficient adherence to traditional doctrines. However, Pope Francis ended the investigation in 2015 and reconciled with the American nuns.

== Creation of tour ==
The bus tour was created as a response to "a blistering critique of American nuns" initiated by the Vatican under Pope Benedict XVI. The critique accused the nuns of being more outspoken on issues of social justice, than on issues that the church hierarchy of the time viewed as more important: abortion and same-sex marriage. In a program the New York Times called a "spirited retort to the Vatican" the nuns organized a bus trip across nine states, visiting homeless shelters, pantries, education and health care facilities run by nuns. The purpose was to give visibility to the nuns' efforts on behalf of the poor and disenfranchised.

== 2012 tours ==
The nuns undertook several tours in 2012, an election year in the United States, educating followers on issues of social justice. The first bus carried only 12 nuns to make room for a sound system, signs and a podium, and many would-be riders had to be turned away for lack of space.

It was decided that the group on board would be rotated to include Sisters of Charity of the Blessed Virgin Mary, the Daughters of Charity and the Sisters of Social Service.

=== First tour ===
The bus tour began on June 18, 2012, in Iowa and ended on July 2 in Washington D.C. It covered 2700 miles and nine states. The tour planned to stop at homeless shelters, food pantries, schools and health care facilities run by nuns to highlight their work with the nation's poor and disenfranchised" and "to protest cuts in programs for the poor and working families in the federal budget that was passed by the House of Representatives and proposed by Representative Paul D. Ryan, a Wisconsin Republican who cited his Catholic faith to justify the cuts".

=== Upstate New York and Nuns on the Ferry ===
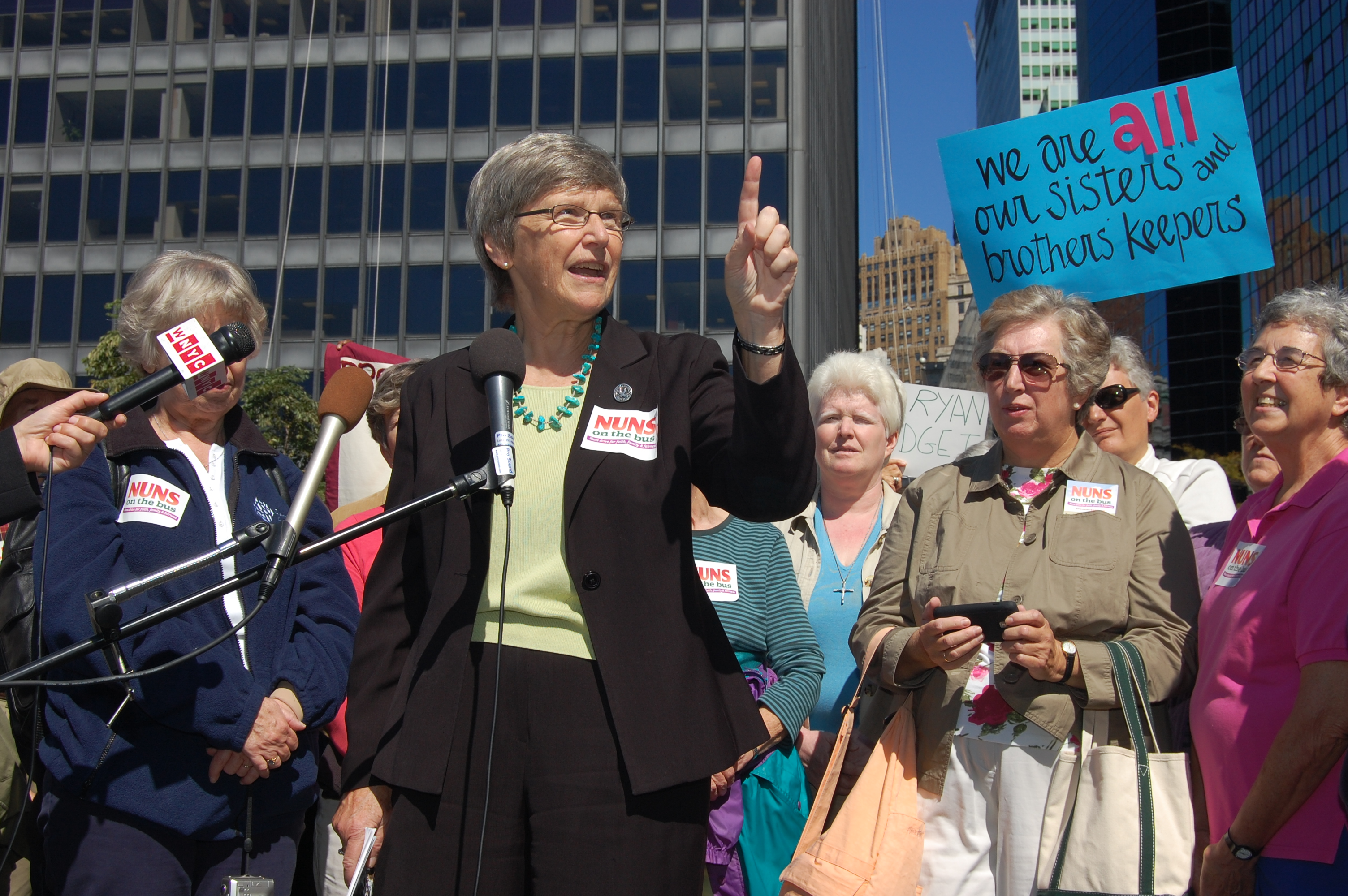
Sister Simone Campbell of "Nuns On The Bus" speaking in lower Manhattan - the Whitehall / South Ferry terminal. This was part of a "Nuns On The Ferry" event.

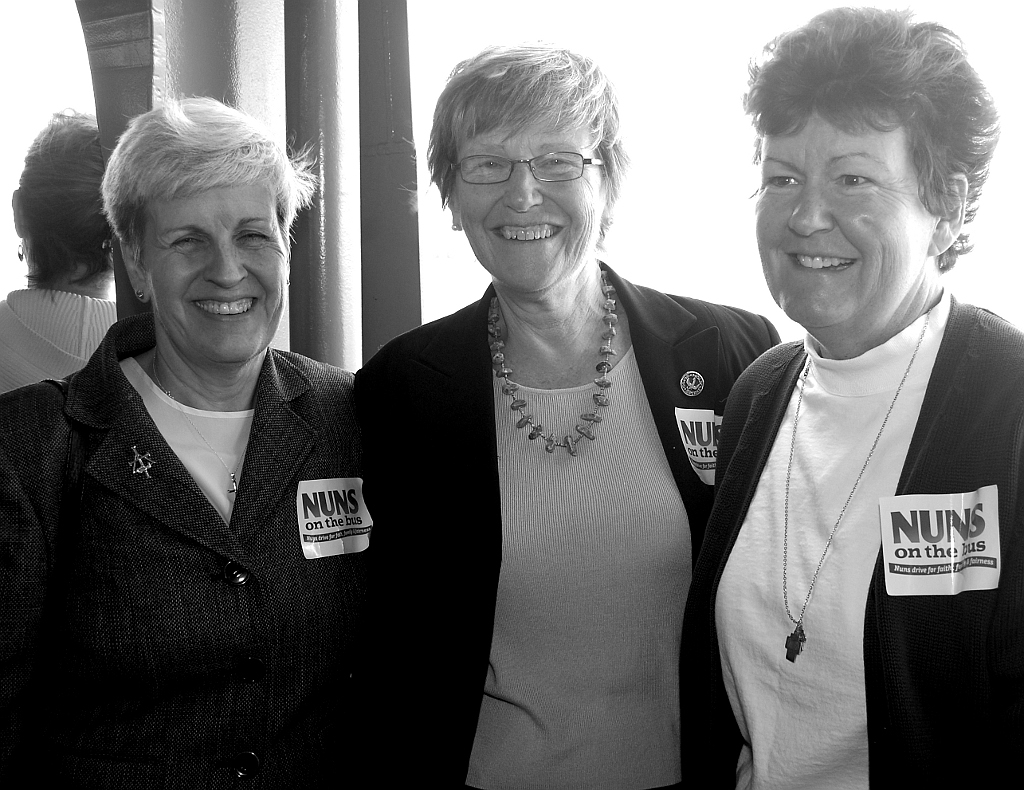
Three nuns from the Nuns On The Bus initiative taking the ferry to Staten Island where they spoke, on the steps of Borough Hall. Left to right: Sr. Janet Kinney Sr. Simone Campbell, and Sr. Mary Ellen Lacy.

In September, the nuns rode the Staten Island Ferry at the end of a tour of Upstate New York.

=== Ohio tour ===
They toured the state of Ohio, over 1000 miles, starting on October 10 and ending on October 15. It coincided with the vice-presidential debate, a United States election tradition, between Ryan and the then-serving Vice President Joe Biden on October 11.

On Monday, October 15, 2012, they met with Bill Johnson, in Marietta, Ohio. Tea party activists picketed with signs such as "Bums on the Bus" and "Romney-Ryan Yes, Fake Nuns No,". Protestors focussed on the issue of abortion, claiming the nuns were insufficiently anti-abortion. The nuns rejected that criticism.

The "Nuns on the Bus" advocacy against proposed budget cuts including "food stamps, social services block grants, the child tax credit and other vital programs" aligns with the policy of US Conference of Catholic Bishops.

== 2013 tour ==
The nuns' 2013 tour concerned immigration reform. The first stop on this tour was Liberty State Park, with views of Ellis Island, an important place in the American history of immigration. At this event, Monsignor Kevin Sullivan endorsed the work of the sisters. The nuns completed a 6,800-mile trek across the U.S., from New York to California. The Senate bill for the Border Security, Economic Opportunity, and Immigration Modernization Act of 2013 passed in June 2013. Minority leader of the United States House of Representatives Nancy Pelosi "said the nuns' principles mirror the priorities of House Democrats, who largely support an immigration bill that passed the Senate." House Republicans, especially from Florida, Texas, and California, were the target the nuns' lobbying. As part of the campaign, they met with immigrants, business leaders and public officials, urging them to call on Congress to pass comprehensive immigration reform that would:

- Guarantee family unity
- Protect the rights of immigrant workers
- Acknowledge that U.S. borders are already secure, with only minor changes needed
- Accelerate processing of already-approved immigrants
- Enhance the current diversity visa program
- Provides a clear and direct pathway to citizenship for the 11 million people who are undocumented in the U.S.

== 2014 tour ==
For the third time in three years, the nuns embarked on a tour in 2014. The trip through 10 key U.S. Senate battleground states was scheduled to last a month and focus on campaigning against the impact of outside money on politics. The issue of "dark money" has received attention particularly through the large donations from wealthy donors. Sister SImone Campbell said the tour was not advocating any particular policy regarding unregulated campaign contributions. Rather, it focused on voter registration drives particularly in low-income neighborhoods, encouraging voters to cast their ballots in the November election. One of the campaign themes against outside money was: "Vote: Strong voter turnout overpowers the influence of big money in politics. Dollars can't vote, you can." Campbell was interviewed during the stop in Des Moines, Iowa, where she clarified that the 2014 bus tour centers on the nuns' belief that "the growth and influence of outside money in our political system threatens to undermine the nation's democratic foundations by silencing the voices of everyday Americans." She added that this is a non-partisan issue. "This trip isn't about progressive or liberal. It's about 100 percent voting. It's a middle of the road issue," Campbell said.

== 2015 tour ==
In the autumn of 2015, coinciding with the visit of Pope Francis in the United States, nearly a dozen nuns began their tour in St. Louis as part of their travel through seven states: Missouri, Kansas, Arkansas, Tennessee, Indiana, Ohio, West Virginia. The theme of the 2015 tour was "Bridge the Divide" with a focus on transforming politics. The end of their tour purposely coincided with the Pope's visit to Washington, D.C. Sister Simone was one of a group of individuals invited to welcome him at the White House.

== 2016 tour ==
The 2016 tour focused on the theme of "Mend the Gaps." The sisters called on government officials and candidates to mend the perceived gaps in income and wealth inequality in the United States. On its path from Wisconsin to Philadelphia, the bus stopped at both the Democratic and Republican conventions. Sister Susan Rose Francois, a Sister of The Sisters of St. Joseph of Peace, blogged about the 2016 tour.

== 2018 tour ==
The 2018 tour focused on drawing attention to members of Congress and their records on social justice. The tour began on October 8, 2018, in Los Angeles, California and conclude on November 2 at the Mar-a-Lago resort owned by President Donald Trump in Palm Beach, Florida. There the nuns shared the stories they listened to on their cross-country journey. The purpose of the tour was to hold members of Congress accountable for their votes on the 2017 Tax Bill and their attempts to repeal the Affordable Care Act. After 27 days on the road visiting 21 states and holding 54 events protesting President Donald Trump's tax cut, the Nuns of the Bus’ Tax Justice Truth Tour to Mar-a-Lago finally reached its destination November 2, 2018.

== 2020 virtual tour ==
In response to the pandemic restrictions, the sisters held their first virtual tour. It emphasized multi-issue voting, under the title of "Who We Elect Matters". Although at first disappointed that the physical bus would be unable to travel, Meg Olson blogged her opinion that there were benefits to holding the event online because it allowed the team to "...do things that would have never happened on the road in real life". The 2020 Virtual Tour was a collaboration between "Network Lobby" and "Network Advocates for Catholic Social Justice".

== 2024 tour ==
In the fall of 2024, the eighth tour will be held. It will include 20 cities, starting in Philadelphia on Sept. 30 and concluding in San Francisco on Oct. 18. In an effort to reach out to other communities, the nuns will be joined this time by 15 multifaith and secular partners, including the Friends Committee on National Legislation and the Children's Defense Fund.

== Book ==
Campbell's memoir, entitled A Nun on the Bus: How All of Us Can Create Hope, Change, and Community, was published in April 2014.

== See also ==
- Leadership Conference of Women Religious
