= Kevin Shea (administrator) =

American civil servant

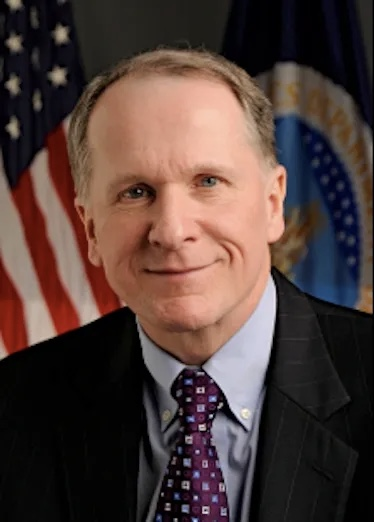

Acting United States Secretary of Agriculture
- In office January 20, 2021 – February 24, 2021
- President: Joe Biden
- Preceded by: Sonny Perdue
- Succeeded by: Tom Vilsack

Personal details
- Education: DeMatha Catholic High School; University of Maryland (BA); University of Baltimore (JD)

Kevin Shea is an American administrator who served as the acting United States secretary of agriculture from January to February 2021. A career civil servant, he served as the Administrator of the Animal and Plant Health Inspection Service (APHIS), a division of the United States Department of Agriculture, until December 2023, when Michael Watson became APHIS Administrator.

As administrator, Shea oversaw the USDA agency responsible for protecting the health of U.S. animal and plant agriculture, enforcing the Federal Animal Welfare Act, and regulating the field testing of genetically engineered crops, among other responsibilities. On the animal welfare front, Shea's agency filed legal complaints against tiger owners violating the Animal Welfare Act of 1966, including one in July 2016 against Tim Stark and Wildlife in Need; and again in August 2020, against Jeff Lowe, the former business partner of Joe Exotic, regarding the alleged mistreatment of his tiger cubs. The latter case resulted in a federal judge, John F. Heil III, requiring the surrender of all tiger cubs in mid-January 2021.

APHIS is also, notably, the agency responsible for keeping foreign animal and plant pests and diseases from entering the United States and works with U.S. Customs and Border Protection to carry out that mission.

Shea is a graduate of DeMatha Catholic High School; the University of Maryland in College Park; and the University of Baltimore School of Law, summa cum laude. He has worked at the Department of Agriculture since 1978. A decorated employee, Shea has received Presidential Rank Awards for Distinguished Service (2012) and Meritorious Service (2009) from President Barack Obama, and Distinguished Service (2004) from President George W. Bush.

Political offices
Preceded by Sonny Perdue	United States Secretary of Agriculture; Acting; 2021	Succeeded by Tom Vilsack
