= Sára Salkaházi =

Hungarian nun (1899–1944)

Blessed Sára Salkaházi SSS
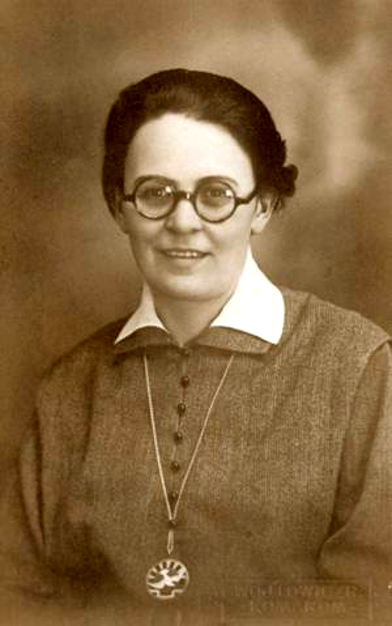
- Born: Sarolta Klotild Schalkház; 11 May 1899; Kassa, Kingdom of Hungary, Austria-Hungary (now Košice, Slovakia)
- Died: 27 December 1944 (aged 45); Budapest, Hungary
- Venerated in: Catholic Church
- Beatified: 17 September 2006, Budapest, Hungary by Cardinal Archbishop Péter Erdő
- Feast: 27 December

Sára Salkaházi, SSS (born Sarolta Klotild Schalkház; 11 May 1899 – 27 December 1944) was a Hungarian Catholic religious sister who saved the lives of approximately one hundred Jews during World War II. Denounced and summarily executed by the pro-Nazi Arrow Cross Party, Salkaházi was beatified in 2006. She was a member of the Sisters of Social Service.

== Early life ==
Salkaházi was born in Kassa (now Košice, Slovakia) on 11 May 1899 to Leopold and Klotild Schalkház, owners of the Hotel Schalkhaz in Kassa. The family was of German origin. Her father died when she was only one years old. Her brother described her as "a tomboy with a strong will and a mind of her own." She earned an elementary school teacher's degree, and later worked as a bookbinder's apprentice, and in a millinery shop. She became a journalist and edited the official paper of the National Christian Socialist Party of Czechoslovakia. At this time, she was far from devout, and at times, even flirted with atheism. Before becoming a religious sister, she was once engaged to be married, but she soon broke off the engagement.

== Religious life ==
The Sisters of Social Service, founded in by Margit Slachta in 1912 were at first reluctant to accept the chain-smoking woman journalist. She joined the congregation in 1929, and took her first vows on Pentecost 1930. Her first assignment was at the Catholic Charities Office in Kosice, where she supervised charity works, managed a religious bookstore, and published a periodical entitled Catholic Women. At the request of the Catholic Bishop's Conference of Slovakia she organized all the various Catholic women's groups into a national Catholic Women's Association, and established the National Girls' Movement. As national director of the Catholic Working Girls' Movement, Salkaházi built the first Hungarian college for working women, near Lake Balaton. To protest the rising Nazi ideology Salkaházi changed her last name to the more Hungarian-sounding "Salkaházi". In Budapest, she opened Homes for working girls and organized training courses. She also wrote a play on the life of Margaret of Hungary, canonized on 19 November 1943.

Her boundless energy was misunderstood by the other sisters as an attempt to draw attention to herself. Her superiors doubted her vocation and refused to allow her to renew her temporary vows, or to wear the habit for a year. She considered leaving. Nevertheless, she continued to live the life of a Sister of Social Service without vows. The Hungarian Benedictines in Brazil were asking for Sisters to work there in mission, and Sara was eager to go, but World War II intervened.

== World War II ==
Salkaházi opened the Working Girls' Homes to provide safe haven for Jews persecuted by the Hungarian Nazi Party. In 1943, she smuggled a Jewish refugee from Slovakia, disguised in the habit of the gray sisters, and the woman's son, out of the Sisters' house in Kassa, which was being searched by the Gestapo, and brought them temporarily to Budapest. During the final months of World War II, she helped shelter hundreds of Jews in a building belonging to the Sisters of Social Service in Hungary's capital, Budapest. About 100 people were aided by Salkahazi herself, who was the national director of Hungarian Catholic Working Women's Movement. As the sister responsible for the house, she secretly made a formal pledge to God in presence of her superior to be prepared to sacrifice herself if only the other sisters were not harmed during the war. The fact and text of the pledge have been preserved in her journals.

== Martyrdom ==
Betrayed to the authorities by a woman working in the house, the Jews she had sheltered were taken prisoner by members of the Hungarian pro-Nazi Arrow Cross Party. Salkaházi was not in the house when the arrests took place and could have fled, yet she chose to return. The prisoners were lined up on the bank of the Danube River on 27 December 1944 and shot, together with four Jewish women and a Christian co-worker who was not a member of her religious institute. Her body was never recovered. The killings came to light in 1967, during the trial of some Arrow Cross members.

In 1969, her deeds on behalf of Hungarian Jews were recognized by Yad Vashem after she was nominated by the daughter of one of the Jewish women she was hiding, who was killed alongside her.

== Beatification ==
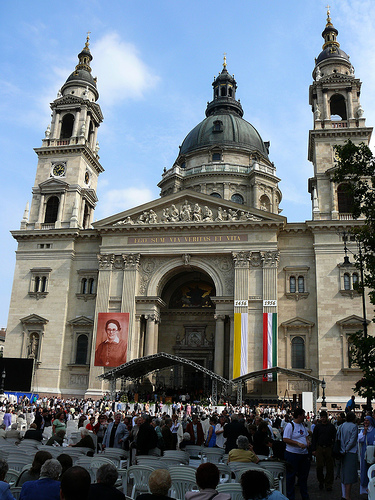
Beatification of Blessed Sára Salkaházi in Budapest, 2006.

On 17 September 2006 Salkaházi was beatified in a proclamation by Pope Benedict XVI, read by Cardinal Péter Erdő during a Mass outside St. Stephen's Basilica in Budapest, which said in part, "She was willing to assume risks for the persecuted ... in days of great fear. Her martyrdom is still topical ... and presents the foundations of our humanity." This is the first beatification to take place in Hungary since that of King Stephen in 1083 along with his son Imre and the Italian Bishop Gerard Sagredo, who were instrumental in converting Hungary to Christianity. If Salkaházi is canonized, she will be the first commoner Hungarian female saint.

Speaking at the Mass, Rabbi József Schweitzer said of Salkaházi, "I know from personal experience ... how dangerous and heroic it was in those times to help Jews and save them from death. Originating in her faith, she kept the commandment of love until death."

Abraham H. Foxman, national director of the Anti-Defamation League, said, "The honor bestowed by Pope Benedict XVI on Sister Sara Salkahazi for risking and eventually giving her life to save Jews in peril is an important statement by the church. It is unfortunate that there were not more individuals like Sister Sara, but her example must be held up to demonstrate how lives can be saved when good people take action to confront evil." Foxman, a Holocaust survivor, had been saved by his Polish Catholic nanny.

Sára Salkaházi took as her motto, "Here I am; send me!"

== Sources ==
- Website on Sister Sára
- Hungarian Martyr Beatified. Sister Sara Salkahazi Helped Jews
