= Simone Campbell =

American lawyer, activist, and nun (born 1945)

Sister Simone Campbell SSS
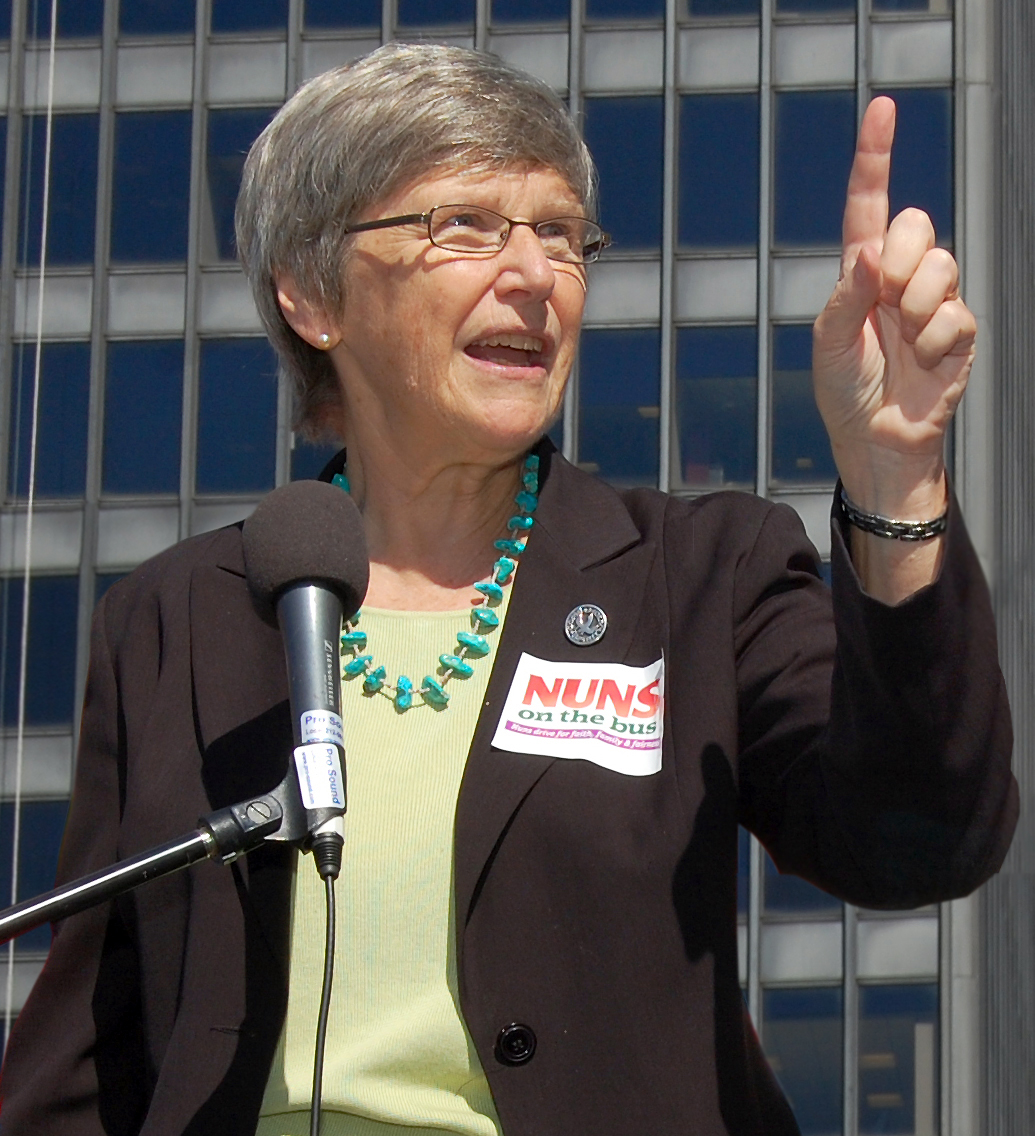
- Sister Simone in 2012
- Born: Mary Campbell; October 22, 1945 (age 81); Santa Monica, California, U.S.
- Education: Mount St. Mary's College; UC Davis School of Law
- Occupations: Religious sister; lawyer; lobbyist
- Organization: NETWORK
- Awards: Presidential Medal of Freedom (2022)

Simone Campbell, SSS (born Mary Campbell; October 22, 1945) is an American Catholic religious sister, lawyer, lobbyist and the former executive director of NETWORK Lobby. She belongs to the Sisters of Social Service. She is known as an outspoken advocate for social justice.

== Early life and education ==
When Campbell was born in Santa Monica, California, to parents who had recently moved from Colorado, she was given the first name "Mary" in honor of her paternal grandmother. She was the eldest of four siblings.

She joined the Sisters of Social Service, an international Catholic religious congregation rooted in the Benedictine tradition, in 1964 and took her final vows in 1973, adopting the name "Simone."

She received a bachelor's degree in 1969 from Mount St. Mary's College in Los Angeles. In 1977, Campbell received the degree of Juris Doctor from the University of California, Davis, School of Law, where she had been an editor of the UC Davis Law Review.

== Career ==
In 1978 Campbell founded the Community Law Center in Oakland, California, which she served for the next 18 years as its lead attorney. She practiced family law and worked on the needs of the working poor of her county in Probate Court.

Between 1995 and 2000, Campbell was the General Director of her religious institute and oversaw its activities in the United States, Mexico, Taiwan, and the Philippines.

=== NETWORK ===
Campbell was first recruited to lead NETWORK in 2004 and continues to serve as its executive director.

In March 2010, the United States Congress debated reforms to healthcare, known as the Patient Protection and Affordable Care Act (H. R. 3590). As a part of her work with NETWORK, Campbell wrote the "nuns' letter" supporting the reforms and asked leaders of women's religious orders to sign it. Sixty heads of religious orders and umbrella groups signed and the letter was sent to all members of Congress. The U.S. Conference of Catholic Bishops did not support the healthcare reforms. The letter contributed to the momentum in favor of the legislation. Campbell attended the signing ceremony for the law and received a hug of gratitude from President Obama.

Campbell led the Nuns on the Bus project, in which she also participated. Campbell and a small group of religious sisters (commonly, "nuns") make tours on a dedicated bus to highlight social issues. In 2012, the first year of the project, the Nuns aimed to draw attention to nuns' work with the poor and to protest planned aid cuts. In honor of her advocacy work she was the 2014 recipient of the Pacem in Terris Peace and Freedom Award, which commemorates the 1963 encyclical of Saint John XXIII of the same name.

Campbell addressed the Democratic National Convention held in September 2012, and again in 2020. She retired from Network in 2020.

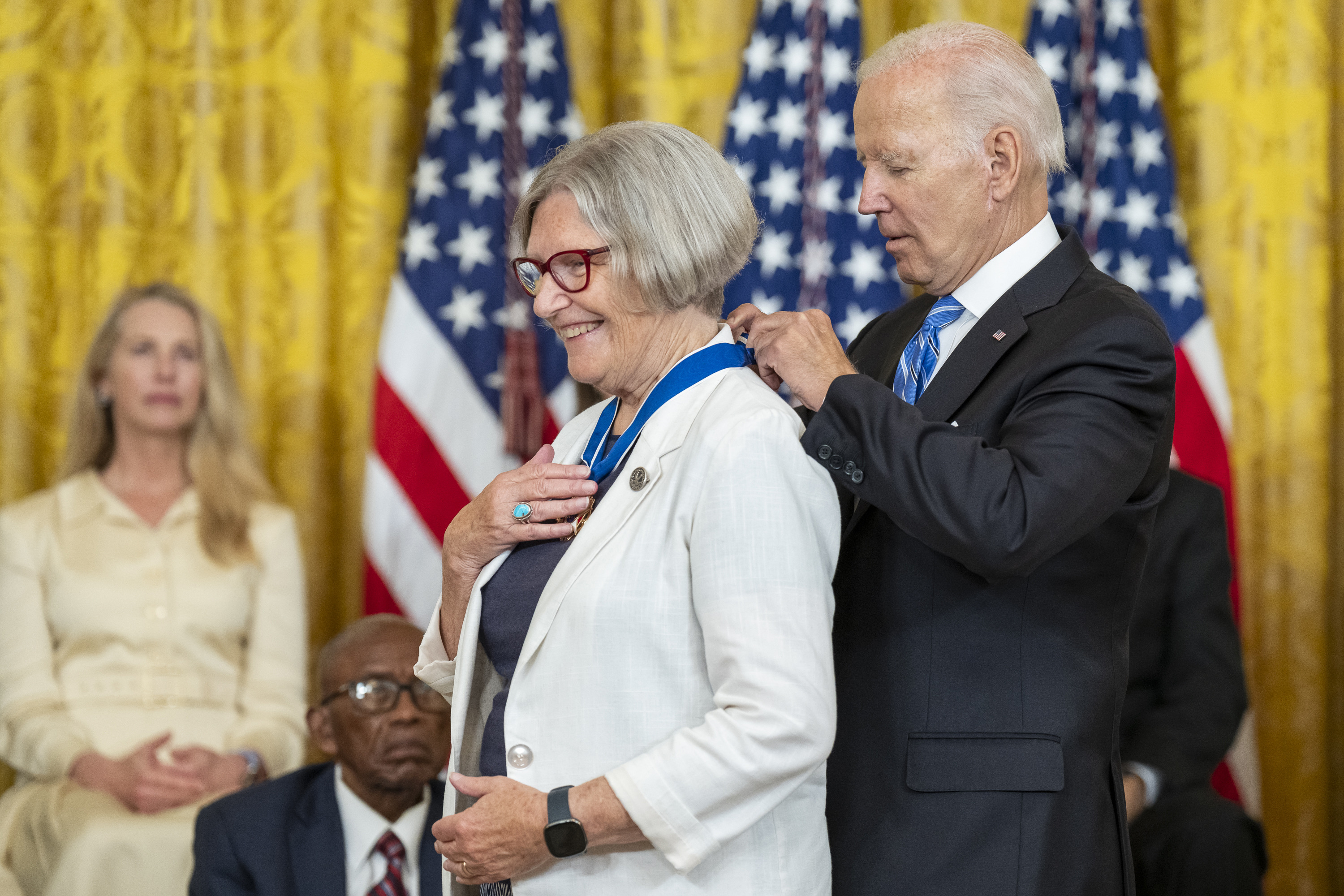
Campbell awarded the Presidential Medal of Freedom by President Joe Biden in July 2022

On July 7, 2022, the White House awarded Campbell the Presidential Medal of Freedom.

== Views ==
Campbell was among the people attentioned by then Pope Benedict XVI in his investigation of American nuns for communist views and promoting "certain radical feminist themes incompatible with the Catholic faith". The investigation was ended by Pope Francis on April 16, 2015. The official report from the investigation was quoted as including "oversight of their publications and choice of speakers for their annual conference to ensure doctrinal orthodoxy, and both sides agreed to a new set of statutes for the LCWR."

Unlike the U.S. Conference of Catholic Bishops, Campbell supported the Affordable Care Act. In her view, this was not only a matter of social justice but also a better way to eliminate abortion rather than through criminalization. She said: "From my perspective, I don't think it's a good policy to outlaw abortion. I think, rather, let's focus on economic development for women and economic opportunity. That's what really makes the change."

With regard to sexual abuse committed by clergy and covered up in the Catholic Church, Campbell noted in 2017 that she found it "outrageous" that the church was failing to sufficiently address sexual abuse and clerical accountability.

== Writings ==
Campbell's memoir A Nun on the Bus was published in 2014.

- Sister Simone Campbell; David Gibson (2014). A nun on the bus: how all of us can create hope, change, and community. New York, NY: HarperOne. ISBN 978-0062273543.

Author Sister Simone Campbell, title: Hunger for Hope: Prophetic Communities, Contemplation and the Common Good. Publisher Orbis Press, New York 2020 ISBN 9781626983786.

== See also ==
- Catholic social teaching
- Christian left
- Progressivism in the United States
- Social justice
- Teresa Forcades
