= Armington elasticity =

Economic parameter

An Armington elasticity is an economic parameter commonly used in models of consumer theory and international trade. It represents the elasticity of substitution between products of different countries, and is based on the assumption made by Paul Armington in 1969 that products traded internationally are differentiated by country of origin.

The Armington assumption has become a standard assumption of international computable general equilibrium models. These models generate smaller and more realistic responses of trade to price changes than implied by models of homogeneous products. Yet no consensus on the magnitude of the elasticity exists. In different contexts, researchers tend to obtain substantially different estimates. A quantitative survey of 3,524 estimates of the Armington elasticity available in 2019 shows that – conditional on these differences and corrected for the publication bias using meta-regression techniques – the Armington elasticity lies in the range 2.5-5.1 with a median estimate at 3.8.
