= Jaden Bradley (American football) =

American football player (born 2003)

No. 86 – Washington Commanders
- Position: Wide receiver
- Roster status: Practice squad

Personal information
- Born: March 25, 2003 (age 23); Fayetteville, North Carolina, U.S.
- Listed height: 6 ft 4 in (1.93 m)
- Listed weight: 195 lb (88 kg)

Career information
- High school: DeMatha (Hyattsville)
- College: Pittsburgh (2021–2022); Charlotte (2023); UNLV (2024–2025)
- NFL draft: 2026: undrafted

Career history
- Washington Commanders (2026–present)

Career NFL statistics as of 2026
- Receptions: 1
- Receiving yards: 12
- Stats at Pro Football Reference

Jaden Glen Bradley (born March 25, 2003) is an American professional football wide receiver for the Washington Commanders of the National Football League (NFL). He played college football for Pittsburgh, Charlotte, and UNLV.

== Career ==
Bradley signed with the Washington Commanders as an undrafted free agent on May 7, 2026. On August 30, Bradley was waived by the Commanders as a part of final roster cuts before the start of the regular season. The following day, he was re–signed to Washington's practice squad. Bradley was elevated to Washington's active roster for the team's Week 9 matchup against the Los Angeles Rams.
