= GTAP =

Network of researchers

Global Trade Analysis Project (GTAP)
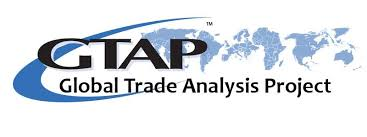
- Established: 1992
- Founder: Thomas Hertel
- Parent institution: Purdue University
- Managing Director: Dominique van der Mennsbrugghe
- Location: Center for Global Trade Analysis; Department of Agricultural Economics; Purdue University; 403 West State Street; West Lafayette, Indiana 47907-2056, United States
- Language: English
- Mission: To provide leadership in economic policy analysis by fostering collaboration to achieve better data and research outcomes.
- Website: gtap.agecon.purdue.edu

GTAP (the Global Trade Analysis Project) is a global network of researchers (mostly from universities, international organizations, and economic and climate/resource ministries of governments) who conduct quantitative analysis of international economic policy issues, including trade policy, climate policy, and globalization linkages to inequality and employment. The consortium produces a consistent global economic database (the GTAP Data Base) which is widely used in the research community to study prospective international economic policy around these issues.

While the consortium includes a large number of international organizations, GTAP itself is coordinated by the Center for Global Trade Analysis, located at Purdue University.

== GTAP consortium and data base ==
Founded by Thomas Hertel in 1992, the project grew out of the Australian IMPACT and SALTER modelling projects, and was heavily influenced by Alan Powell. It is currently directed by Dominique van der Mensbrugghe. A central element of GTAP is a large-scale database that is updated periodically by the consortium members, under coordination of the Center for Global Trade Analysis. The data are important, core structural inputs to a broad range of global economic policy models and related applications: studies of climate change and resource use (including studies feeding into the IPCC process); regional economic integration; and the effects of globalization. For this reason, the consortium membership (those contributing to the database) includes prominent global governance and policy research institutions like the World Bank, European Commission, World Trade Organization, International Monetary Fund, the Massachusetts Institute of Technology Joint Program on the Science and Policy of Global Change, United Nations Conference on Trade and Development, and the Organisation for Economic Co-operation and Development. There are currently three "Consortium Members At Large" – Joseph Francois, Mark Horridge, and Brian O'Neill, who represent the broader scientific community. The primary database is essentially a multi-year form of a multi-region input output (MRIO) database supplemented by national macroeconomic data, though extensive satellite datasets cover other measures that are linked to the economic flows in the core database, including trade policies, greenhouse gas emissions, energy use, migration flows, and land use patterns. While from its inception the database was closely tied to the computable general equilibrium (CGE) research community, in recent years the database has also been at the center of greenhouse gas emissions accounting exercises, and related assessments of resource use.

== Other activities ==
In addition to the multinational effort needed to update and expand the project database, the Center for Global Trade Analysis also offers courses on practical, model-based economic policy analysis. This includes courses on basic computational modelling and dynamic general equilibrium modelling. The standard GTAP Model, which serves as a maquete or framework model linking the database to a basic general equilibrium system, was developed with the GEMPACK suite of software but is also implemented using the GAMS suite of software. The center also organizes a large-scale annual conference on global economic policy modelling. The center also provides awards and recognition to members of the research community, including the Alan A. Powell Award and the GTAP Research Fellow awards.

== Technical references ==
- Burfisher, Mary, Introduction to Computable General Equilibrium Models, Cambridge University Press: Cambridge, 2011, ISBN 9780521139779.
- Corong, Erwin L. et al. (2017) "The Standard GTAP Model, Version 7." Journal of Global Economic Analysis, Vol2(1): 1–119.
- Hertel, Thomas, Global Trade Analysis: Modeling and Applications (Modelling and Applications), Cambridge University Press: Cambridge, 1999, ISBN 978-0521643740.
- Lanz, Bruno and Rutherford, Thomas F. (2016) "GTAPinGAMS: Multiregional and Small Open Economy Models." Journal of Global Economic Analysis, Vol 1 (2): 1–77.
