= Applied general equilibrium =

In mathematical economics, applied general equilibrium (AGE) models were pioneered by Herbert Scarf at Yale University in 1967, in two papers, and a follow-up book with Terje Hansen in 1973, with the aim of empirically estimating the Arrow–Debreu model of general equilibrium theory with empirical data, to provide "“a general method for the explicit numerical solution of the neoclassical model” (Scarf with Hansen 1973: 1)

Scarf's method iterated a sequence of simplicial subdivisions which would generate a decreasing sequence of simplices around any solution of the general equilibrium problem. With sufficiently many steps, the sequence would produce a price vector that clears the market.

Brouwer's Fixed Point theorem states that a continuous mapping of a simplex into itself has at least one fixed point. This paper describes a numerical algorithm for approximating, in a sense to be explained below, a fixed point of such a mapping (Scarf 1967a: 1326).

Scarf never built an AGE model, but hinted that “these novel numerical techniques might be useful in assessing consequences for the economy of a change in the economic environment” (Kehoe et al. 2005, citing Scarf 1967b). His students elaborated the Scarf algorithm into a tool box, where the price vector could be solved for any changes in policies (or exogenous shocks), giving the equilibrium ‘adjustments’ needed for the prices. This method was first used by Shoven and Whalley (1972 and 1973), and then was developed through the 1970s by Scarf’s students and others.

Most contemporary applied general equilibrium models are numerical analogs of traditional two-sector general equilibrium models popularized by James Meade, Harry Johnson, Arnold Harberger, and others in the 1950s and 1960s. Earlier analytic work with these models has examined the distortionary effects of taxes, tariffs, and other policies, along with functional incidence questions. More recent applied models, including those discussed here, provide numerical estimates of efficiency and distributional effects within the same framework.

Scarf's fixed-point method was a break-through in optimization and computational economics. Later researchers continued to develop iterative methods for computing fixed-points, both for topological models like Scarf's and for models described by functions with continuous second derivatives or convexity or both. Of course, "global Newton methods" for essentially convex and smooth functions and path-following methods for diffeomorphisms converged faster than did robust algorithms for continuous functions, when the smooth methods are applicable.

== AGE and CGE models ==
AGE models, being based on Arrow–Debreu general equilibrium theory, work in a different manner than CGE models. The model first establishes the existence of equilibrium through the standard Arrow–Debreu exposition, then inputs data into all the various sectors, and then applies Scarf’s algorithm (Scarf 1967a, 1967b and Scarf with Hansen 1973) to solve for a price vector that would clear all markets. This algorithm would narrow down the possible relative prices through a simplex method, which kept reducing the size of the ‘net’ within which possible solutions were found. AGE modelers then consciously choose a cutoff, and set an approximate solution as the net never closed on a unique point through the iteration process.

CGE models are based on macro balancing equations, and use an equal number of equations (based on the standard macro balancing equations) and unknowns solvable as simultaneous equations, where exogenous variables are changed outside the model, to give the endogenous results.
