= Sisters of Social Service =

Hungarian Catholic religious institute

The Sisters of Social Service (SSS; Hungarian: Szociális Testvérek Társasága, Latin: Societas Sororum Socialium) are a Catholic religious institute of women founded in Hungary in 1923 by Margit Slachta. The sisters adopted the social mission of the Catholic Church and Benedictine spirituality with a special devotion to the Holy Spirit.

== Foundation ==
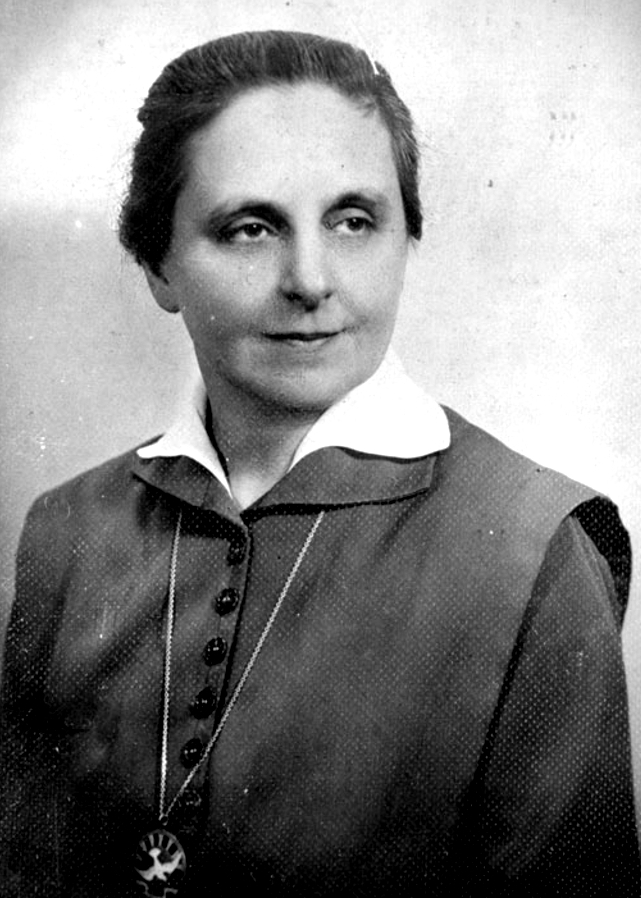
Margit Slachta in 1946

The institute was founded by Margit Slachta, a pioneer in social services and a leading Hungarian political figure, who trained other women for political action. In 1920 she became the first woman elected to the Hungarian Parliament, where she actively promoted workers’ rights, stressing the well-being of women, children and families. She was inspired by the social and economic turmoil in Europe following the First World War, when tens of thousands of people were living in wretched conditions across the continent. Hungary had seen its territory reduced by some sixty percent by the Allies and was also suffering from waves of political terror by competing forces, as well as conquest by the Kingdom of Romania of much of its eastern regions.

Slachta and the other founders of the Sisters of Social Service were strongly influenced by their experiences working in the Social Mission Society which was founded by Edit Farkas in Budapest in 1908. In 1923 Farkas implemented a number of changes in the organization including a planned merger with a Jesuit women's society. As a result, Slachta, Sister Friderika Horváth (future founder of the SSS in California), and four other sisters left the society and sought to form a new organization founded on the same principles as the original Social Mission Society of working in the world with the poor, but with a greater emphasis on working in politics.

== A new religious institute ==
A dedicated Catholic, Slachta was led to form a religious institute along with some of her coworkers to carry out their commitment to care for the needy and suffering around them. This congregation was established in 1923 under the name of the Sisters of Social Service. The members made the social mission of the Church the motivating thrust of their lives. The Sisters dedicated themselves to God by vows.

Like many earlier religious communities of women which arose in similar social conditions (e.g., the Sisters of the Visitation and the Ursulines), the Sisters saw their commitment as being out on the street, involved in the daily struggles of the poor, and they structured their way of life to serve this ministry. To this end, in place of the traditional religious habit of floor-length robes and veils, they adopted simple gray suits as worn by other women of the day. Their aim was to be involved in the social organizations serving these aims. This was to be lived through a daily routine directed by the Rule of Saint Benedict.

== Growth ==
As the community grew, foundations were set up in other areas. Auguszta Ikrich was already working in Romania when she and her associates joined the Sisters of Social Service in 1923. The Slovak District was established by Sister Anita Kowalcze in 1927 in the city of Kassa. Sister Paula Rónai founded a center in Stockholm. During the 1920s, the Sisters followed the massive emigration of the Hungarian population around the world. Sisters also left Budapest to begin a work with Hungarian immigrants on the plains of Western Canada. In 1926 the California District was started in Los Angeles.

From the beginning, the Sisters provided charitable services to the poor. They founded and maintained schools to train social workers, organized and led Christian women's movements, worked on Christian formation, and served on municipal councils. They were, in effect, the first religious congregation of social workers in the United States.

== World War II ==
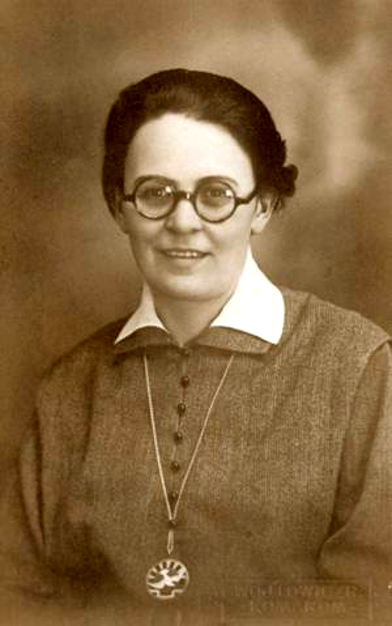
Sister Sára Salkaházi was beatified for sheltering Jews during the Holocaust.

The foundress, Sister Margit, and the other Sisters faced new challenges with the rise of Nazism and the outbreak of World War II. While continuing their commitment to social justice, they also worked to protect their Jewish neighbors. Many of them were sheltered in the motherhouse and in homes organized and run by members of the congregation.

On December 27, 1944, members of the pro-Nazi Arrow Cross Party surrounded the hostel Sister Sára Salkaházi ran and began to arrest the Jewish women being sheltered there, along with a Christian volunteer. Sister Sára arrived during the raid, and identified herself as the director of the house. She was immediately arrested and taken with the other women to the banks of the Danube, where they were all stripped and shot, and their bodies then thrown into the river. Hers was never recovered.

On September 17, 2006, with the authorization of Pope Benedict XVI, she was beatified as a martyr in Budapest by the Cardinal Primate of Hungary, Péter Erdő. She is the first Hungarian who was not a member of the Hungarian royal family to be honored by the Catholic Church in this way.

The entire congregation is credited with having saved the lives of about one thousand Jews from the Nazis.

== Separation ==
The outbreak of the war and the subsequent occupation of Hungary by Communist forces had led to a separation of the communities of the Sisters in the United States and Canada from the Motherhouse in Budapest. As a result, they quickly each became independent of Europe. The Sisters in the United States were headquartered in Los Angeles and those in Canada in Toronto.

The Sisters in the United States were led by Sister Friderika Horváth who had been one of the founding members of the sisterhood.

== Present ==
The Federation of the Sisters of Social Service embraces three continents and nine countries. Today the three separate congregations established from the work of Sister Margit are formed into a federation to honor their joint commitment to her vision. They serve around the globe, with the European congregation serving in Eastern Europe, as well as in Cuba. The American one also works in Mexico, the Philippines, and Taiwan.

== See also ==
- Consecrated life
- Institutes of consecrated life
- Religious institute (Catholic)
- Secular institute
- Sister Simone Campbell
- Society of apostolic life
