= Donald Roy =

Donald Roy may refer to:

- Donald Francis Roy (1909–1980), American sociologist
- Donald Whatley Roy (1881–1960), British obstetrician and gynaecologist
- Donald William Roy (1908–1997), British Commando officer
