= David Firth (statistician) =

British statistician

- Born: 22 December 1957 (age 68); Wakefield, United Kingdom
- Education: University of Cambridge (BA); Imperial College London (MSc, PhD)
- Known for: Bias-reduced maximum likelihood estimates; Election exit-polling; Quasi variances
- Awards: Guy Medal (bronze, 1998) (silver, 2012); John M Chambers Statistical Software Award (2007); Fellow of the British Academy (2008)
- Scientific career
- Fields: Statistics
- Workplaces: Imperial College London; University of Texas at Austin; University of Southampton; University of Oxford; Nuffield College, Oxford; University of Warwick
- Thesis: Quasi-likelihood estimation: Efficiency and other aspects (1987)
- Doctoral advisor: David Roxbee Cox
- Website: warwick.ac.uk/dfirth

David Firth FBA (born 22 December 1957) is a British statistician. He is Emeritus Professor in the Department of Statistics at the University of Warwick.

== Education ==
Firth was born and went to school in Wakefield. He studied mathematics at the University of Cambridge and completed his PhD in statistics at Imperial College London, supervised by Sir David Cox.

== Research ==
Firth is known for his development of a general method for reducing the bias of maximum likelihood estimation in parametric statistical models. The method has seen application in a wide variety of research fields, especially with logistic regression analysis where the reduced-bias estimates also have reduced variance and are always finite; the latter property overcomes the frequently encountered problem of separation, which causes maximum likelihood estimates to be infinite. The original paper published in 1993 has been cited more than 4000 times according to Google Scholar.

Together with a PhD student, Renée de Menezes, Firth also established the generality of the method of quasi variances, a device for summarizing economically the estimated effects of a categorical predictor variable in a statistical model.

== Applied work ==
Firth developed (in collaboration with John Curtice) a new statistical approach to the design and analysis of election-day exit polls for UK General Elections. The new methods have been used at UK General Elections since 2005 to produce the widely broadcast close-of-polls forecast of seats in the House of Commons.

== Awards and honours ==
Firth was elected as a Fellow of the British Academy in 2008. He was the recipient of the Royal Statistical Society's Guy Medal in Bronze in 1998 and in Silver in 2012. With Dr Heather Turner he won the John M Chambers Statistical Software Award of the American Statistical Association in 2007, for the gnm package which facilitates working with generalized nonlinear models (a synthesis of nonlinear regression and generalized linear models) in R.

He is a former Editor of the Journal of the Royal Statistical Society, Series B (Statistical Methodology).
