= Hurdle model =

Class of statistical models

A hurdle model is a class of statistical models where a random variable is modelled using two parts, the first of which is the probability of attaining the value 0, and the second part models the probability of the non-zero values. The use of hurdle models is often motivated by an excess of zeroes in the data that is not sufficiently accounted for in more standard statistical models.

In a hurdle model, a random variable x is modelled as

$$\Pr (x = 0) = \theta$$
$$\Pr (x \ne 0) = p_{x \ne 0}(x)$$

where $p_{x \ne 0}(x)$ is a truncated probability distribution function, truncated at 0.

Hurdle models were introduced by John G. Cragg in 1971, where the non-zero values of x were modelled using a normal model, and a probit model was used to model the zeros. The probit part of the model was said to model the presence of "hurdles" that must be overcome for the values of x to attain non-zero values, hence the designation hurdle model. Hurdle models were later developed for count data, with Poisson, geometric, and negative binomial models for the non-zero counts.

== Relationship with zero-inflated models ==
Hurdle models differ from zero-inflated models in that zero-inflated models model the zeros using a two-component mixture model. With a mixture model, the probability of the variable being zero is determined by both the main distribution function $p(x = 0)$ and the mixture weight $\pi$. Specifically, a zero-inflated model for a random variable x is

$$\Pr (x = 0) = \pi + (1 - \pi) \times p(x = 0)$$

$$\Pr (x = h_i) = (1 - \pi) \times p(x = h_i)$$

where $\pi$ is the mixture weight that determines the amount of zero-inflation. A zero-inflated model can only increase the probability of $\Pr (x = 0)$, but this is not a restriction in hurdle models.

== See also ==
- Zero-inflated model
- Truncated normal hurdle model
