= Common source bias =

Type of selection bias and source of logical errors

Common source bias is a type of sampling bias, occurring when both dependent and independent variables are collected from the same group of people. This bias can occur in various forms of research, such as surveys, experiments, and observational studies. Some scholars believe that common source bias is a significant concern for any study as it can lead to unreliable results, and therefore must be controlled. It is most prevalent in the field of public administration research, where performance measures subject to common source bias can produce false positives when organisational performance is evaluated with explanatory and perceptual measures from the same source.

== Occurrence ==
Common source bias can be categorised into two types: common method bias, also known as common method variance, and common source bias. Common method bias occurs when the same method or instrument is used to collect data from multiple sources, which can lead to an over-representation of certain factors. Common source bias occurs when the information or data collected is influenced by a single source, such as a single individual, group, or organisation.

One of the major causes of common source bias is the influence of the source on the data collected. For example, if a survey is conducted by a single individual, their own beliefs, biases, and perspectives can influence the responses of the participants. This "self reporting" is subjective, and limited because it is based on attitudes, values, and behaviours of the individual.

Common source bias is also present in participant selection. If participants are selected based on their association with the source, then their responses may be biased towards the source’s perspective. If participants are selected based on their willingness to participate, then their responses may not be representative of the population as a whole.

== Remedies ==
=== Ex ante remedies ===
A recently proposed ex ante remedy for common source bias is the supplementation of survey data with administrative and/or archival data, however the majority of relevant studies seem to present the view that of the proposed statistical remedies for the bias, none appear to reliably counter the issue. This results in a lack of a comprehensive methodology for how to control method biases.
