= Roy model =

Model for self-selection in economics

The Roy model is one of the earliest works in economics on self-selection due to A. D. Roy. The basic model considers two types of workers that choose occupation in one of two sectors.

== Original model ==
Roy's original paper deals with workers selecting into fishing and hunting professions, where there is no uncertainty about the amount of goods (fish or rabbits) that will be caught in a given period, but fishing is more costly as it requires more skill. The central question that Roy tries to answer in the original paper is whether the best hunters will hunt, and the best fishermen will fish. While the discussion is non-mathematical, it is observed that choices will depend on the distribution of skills, the correlation between these skills in the population, and the technology available to use these skills.

== Further developments ==
George Borjas was the first to formalize the model of Roy in a mathematical sense and apply it to self-selection in immigration. Specifically, assume source country 0 and destination country 1, with log earnings in a country i given by w_{i}= a_{i} + e_{i}, where e_{i}~N(0, $s_i^2$ ). Additionally, assume there is a cost C associated with migrating from country 0 to country 1 and workers know all parameters and their own realization of e_{0} and e_{1}. Borjas then uses the implications of the Roy model to infer something about what wages for immigrants in country 1 would have been had they stayed in country 0 and what wages for non-immigrants in country 0 would have been had they migrated. The third, and final, element needed for this is the correlation between the wages in the two countries, ρ. A worker will choose to immigrate if $a_1 - a_0 - C + e_1 - e_0 > 0$ which will happen with probability 1-Φ(v) where v is $\frac {-(a_{1} - a_{0}-{C})}{s_{v}}$ , s_{v} is the standard deviation of e_{1} – e_{0}, and Φ is the standard normal cdf. This leads to the famous central result that the expected wage for immigrants depends on the selection mechanism, as shown in equation (1), where ϕ is the standard normal pdf and, like before, Φ is the standard normal cdf:

$E[w_0 \mid \mathrm{Immigrate}] = a_0 + \rho s_0 \left(\frac {\phi ({v})}{1-\phi ({v}) }\right)$ (1)

While Borjas was the first to mathematically formalize the Roy model, it has guided thinking in other fields of research as well. A famous example by James Heckman and Bo Honoré who study labor market participation using the Roy model, where the choice equation leads to the Heckman correction procedure. More generally, Heckman and Vytlacil propose the Roy model as an alternative to the LATE framework proposed by Joshua Angrist and Guido Imbens.
