= Censoring =

Censoring may refer to:

- Censoring (statistics)
- Censorship
- Internet censorship
