= Stephen Cameron =

American economist

Academic background
- Education: University of Chicago; Brigham Young University
- Doctoral advisor: James Heckman

Academic work
- Discipline: Microeconomics
- School or tradition: Chicago School of Economics
- Institutions: Columbia University
- Awards: Hettleman Award for Excellence in Research and Teaching
- Website: sipa.columbia.edu/faculty/stephen-v-cameron

Stephen Cameron is an American financial analyst, economist and author. He was for many years an associate professor of economics at Columbia University, and is currently serving as Director at Citi.

He is most noted for his econometric and applied work on educational selection, the dynamics of educational attainment, and the causal value of General Educational Development test outcomes while a professor at Columbia and a dissertator under James Heckman at the University of Chicago.

He has held quantitative financial analyst and management roles at Wall Street firms, including Citadel LLC, Lord Abbett, and Continuum Investment Management. A graduate of the University of Chicago and Brigham Young University, he has co-authored an academic book studying poverty in New York City. He lives in New York City with his children and wife Marianne Cameron, a historian and Fulbright-Hays Recipient.

== See also ==
- List of economists
- List of University of Chicago alumni
- List of Brigham Young University alumni
- List of Columbia University people
- Publications by Stephen V. Cameron at ResearchGate
