= Diane Lambert =

American statistician

Diane Marie Lambert is an American statistician known for her work on zero-inflated models, a method for extending Poisson regression to applications such as the statistics of manufacturing defects in which one can expect to observe a large number of zeros. A former Bell Labs Fellow, she is a research scientist for Google, where she lists her current research areas as "algorithms and theory, data mining and modeling, and economics and electronic commerce".

== Education and career ==
Lambert earned her Ph.D. in 1978 from the University of Rochester. Her dissertation, supervised by W. Jackson Hall, was P-Values: Asymptotics and Robustness. In the early part of her career, she worked as a faculty member at Carnegie Mellon University. As an assistant professor there, she did pioneering work on the confidentiality of statistical information. She earned tenure at Carnegie Mellon, but moved to Bell Labs in 1986. At Bell Labs, she became head of statistics, and a Bell Labs Fellow. She moved again to Google in 2005.

== Recognition ==
Lambert became a Fellow of the American Statistical Association in 1991. She is also a Fellow of the Institute of Mathematical Statistics, was executive secretary of the institute from 1990 to 1993, and was one of the institute's Medallion Lecturers in 1995.
