= Quasi-variance =

Quasi-variance (qv) estimates are a statistical approach that is suitable for communicating the effects of a categorical explanatory variable within a statistical model. In standard statistical models the effects of a categorical explanatory variable are assessed by comparing one category (or level) that is set as a benchmark against which all other categories are compared. The benchmark category is usually referred to as the 'reference' or 'base' category. In order for comparisons to be made the reference category is arbitrarily fixed to zero. Statistical data analysis software usually undertakes formal comparisons of whether or not each level of the categorical variable differs from the reference category. These comparisons generate the well known 'significance values' of parameter estimates (i.e., coefficients). Whilst it is straightforward to compare any one category with the reference category, it is more difficult to formally compare two other categories (or levels) of an explanatory variable with each other when neither is the reference category. This is known as the reference category problem.

Quasi-variances are approximations of variances. Quasi-variances are statistics associated with the parameter estimates (coefficients) of the different levels of categorical explanatory variables within statistical models. Quasi-variances can be presented alongside parameter estimates to enable readers to assess differences between any combinations of parameter estimates for a categorical explanatory variable. The approach is beneficial because such comparisons are not usually possible without access to the full variance-covariance matrix for the estimates.

Using quasi-variance estimates addresses the reference category problem. The underlying idea was first proposed by Ridout but the technique was set out by David Firth and Renee Menezes. The suitability of this technique for social science data analysis has been demonstrated.

== See also ==
- Regression model
- Generalized linear model
- Explanatory variable
