= Censored regression model =

Censored regression models are a class of models in which the dependent variable is censored above or below a certain threshold. A commonly used likelihood-based model to accommodate to a censored sample is the Tobit model, but quantile and nonparametric estimators have also been developed. These and other censored regression models are often confused with truncated regression models. Truncated regression models are used for data where whole observations are missing so that the values for the dependent and the independent variables are unknown. Censored regression models are used for data where only the value for the dependent variable is unknown while the values of the independent variables are still available.

Censored dependent variables frequently arise in econometrics. A common example is labor supply. Data are frequently available on the hours worked by employees, and a labor supply model estimates the relationship between hours worked and characteristics of employees such as age, education and family status. However, such estimates undertaken using linear regression will be biased by the fact that for people who are unemployed it is not possible to observe the number of hours they would have worked had they had employment. Still we know age, education and family status for those observations.

== See also ==
- Nonlinear regression
- Nonparametric regression
- Sampling bias
- Truncated normal hurdle model
