= A. D. Roy =

British economist (1920–2003)

- Born: Andrew Donald Roy; 28 June 1920
- Died: 12 March 2003 (aged 82); London, England

Academic background
- Education: University of Cambridge, (MA)

Academic work
- Discipline: Economics
- Notable ideas: Roy model on self-selection and income distributions Roy's safety-first criterion

Andrew Donald Roy (28 June 1920 – 12 March 2003) was a British economist who is known for the Roy model of self-selection and income distribution and Roy's safety-first criterion.

== Early life and education ==
Andrew Donald Roy was born 28 June 1920. His father, Donald Whatley Roy, was a physician. A. D. Roy began studies in mathematics at Sidney Sussex College, Cambridge, in 1938. He won the distinguished Tripos award in 1939 in mathematics. His studies were interrupted by the outbreak of World War II, and he eventually served in the Fourteenth Army in India. He fought in the Battle of Imphal which stemmed the Japanese invasion of India in 1944. During his service, Roy contracted jaundice and suffered a nervous collapse, which lingered in the form of depression. After the war, he returned to Cambridge to study economics and history and was awarded a second Tripos award in economics in 1948. He later married Katherine Juliet Grove-White, and the pair had a son, Donald James Roy, and two daughters. He completed his Master of Arts in Economics at Cambridge in 1950, reading under Professor Edward Austin Gossage Robinson. Roy died on 12 March 2003 of heart disease. (See Sullivan, 2011 for a more complete biography and Heckman and Sattinger, 2015 for an intellectual biography.)

== Career ==
Roy was appointed Faculty Assistant Lecturer in Statistics at Cambridge University in 1949. In 1950, Roy was appointed Director of Economic Studies at Cambridge and then University Lecturer in Economics and Politics at Sidney Sussex College in 1951. While at Cambridge, Roy wrote an influential paper on productivity and the shape of the distribution of earnings which he substantially generalized in his seminal 1951 article on self-selection and income inequality (Roy, 1951). In addition, Roy made a fundamental contribution to portfolio theory in his paper 'Safety First and the Holding of Assets' (1952).

Roy left Sidney Sussex in 1962 to serve as Economic Consultant and later Senior Economic Advisor to the Treasury. In 1964, Roy entered civil service, and worked for the Treasury, Department of Trade and Industry, Ministry of Defence, and Department of Health and Social Security. During this time, Roy addressed issues more closely related to macroeconomics such as labor productivity (Roy, 1982; Roy and Wenban-Smith, 1983).

== Contributions ==
Roy (1951) recognized that a major mechanism guiding assignment in the labor market is David Ricardo's principle of comparative advantage. A worker choosing an occupation will compare the income from one occupation with the income from another occupation. To use the example provided by Roy in his 1951 paper, a person who chose trout fishing would have a comparative advantage at that activity compared to a person who chose rabbit catching. A second consequence of the choice of occupations is that the distribution of earnings is built up from the distributions of earnings in individual occupations. The distribution of earnings within an occupation is affected by the selection of workers into that occupation, as determined by 'the association existing between any individual's performance in the two occupations' (Roy, 1951, p. 494). Roy considers both positive and negative correlation between performances. As a result of the selection, the aggregate distribution of earnings depends on the occupations available to workers and their performances in different occupations.

Selection among alternative occupations, as described by Roy, draws on notions of potential outcomes used in the literature on the design of experiments (Neyman, 1923; Cox, 1958). Like later work by Quandt (1972), Gronau (1974) and Heckman (1974, 1976), he added a choice mechanism to the model of potential outcomes in the statistical literature determining allocations of individuals across sectors associated with outcomes. Roy introduced economic decision-making into the determination of occupations and earnings and thereby anticipated procedures later used for the rigorous analysis of earnings data.

Roy's selection phenomenon has been applied and extended to a wide range of other contexts, including: choice of market versus non-market work and wage comparisons (Gronau, 1974; Heckman, 1974, 1976; Lewis, 1974); and more general decision rules (see the survey in Heckman and Vytlacil, 2007a). His work also affected analysis of choice in: union versus non-union sectors (Lee, 1978); levels of education (Willis and Rosen, 1979); geographical region (Robinson and Tomes, 1982); marital status (McElroy and Horney, 1981); occupational choice (Miller, 1984); piece rate versus salary pay structures (Lazear, 1986); industry changers (Solon, 1988; Gibbons and Katz, 1992); immigration (Borjas, 1990); and segmented labor markets (Magnac, 1991). Flinn and Heckman (1982) extend Roy's selection model by incorporating choices based on search. See French and Taber (2011) for a comprehensive discussion of the use of the Roy model in labor economics.

Analysis of selection bias has led to substantial improvements in the evaluation of social programs (Heckman et al., 1996, 1997; Abbring and Heckman, 2007; Heckman and Vytlacil, 2007a, b). A further extension considers general equilibrium models of income distribution and treatment effects (Heckman et al., 1998; Abbring and Heckman, 2007). The Roy (1951) model which analyzes potential outcomes using a choice mechanism improves on later, less clearly formulated work exposited in statistics under the rubric of the "Rubin model". See Heckman (2008) and Heckman and Sattinger (2015).

Roy also made a fundamental contribution to finance. His (1952) paper is widely regarded as a contribution to portfolio theory co-equal with that of the Nobel-Prize winning analysis of Harry Markowitz (1952). Both developed the mean-variance trade-off for a portfolio of correlated assets (Markowitz, 1991). Reflecting on his 1952 work and Roy's (1952) paper, Markowitz wrote: 'On the basis of Markowitz (1952), I am often called the father of modern portfolio theory (MPT), but Roy can claim an equal share of this honor'. (Markowitz, 1999, p. 6) For a more extensive discussion of Roy's contribution to portfolio theory, see Bernstein (1992) and Sullivan (2011).

== Publications ==
- The distribution of earnings and of individual output (subscription required) Economic Journal, vol. 60(239), pp. 489–505. (1950).
- Some Thoughts on the Distribution of Earnings (subscription required) Oxford Economic Papers, New Series, Vol. 3, No. 2 (1951).
- Safety First and the Holding of Assets (subscription required) Econometrica Vol. 20, No. 3 (1952).
- Labour productivity in 1980: an international comparison (subscription required) National Institute Economic Review, vol. 101(1), pp. 26–37. (1982).
- Trends in UK Productivity: A Production Function Approach Roy, A. D.; Wenban-Smith, G. London, UK: National Institute of Economic and Social Research. (1983).
