= John Curtice =

British political scientist (born 1953)

Sir John Curtice FRSA FRSE FBA FAcSS
- Curtice in 2016
- Born: John Kevin Curtice; 10 December 1953 (age 72); Redruth, Cornwall, England
- Occupation: Political scientist
- Spouse: Lisa Joan Riding (m. 1978)
- Children: 1

Academic background
- Education: University of Oxford (MA)

Academic work
- Discipline: Politics
- Institutions: University of Strathclyde; University of Liverpool; University of Oxford
- Website: www.strath.ac.uk/staff/curticejohnprof

John Curtice (2016)

Sir John Kevin Curtice (born 10 December 1953) is a British political scientist and professor of politics at the University of Strathclyde and senior research fellow at the National Centre for Social Research. He is particularly interested in electoral behaviour and researching political and social attitudes. He took a keen interest in the debate about Scottish independence.

== Early life and education ==
Curtice was born on 10 December 1953 in Redruth, and grew up in St Austell, Cornwall. In an interview with The Guardian, Curtice said his interest in electoral behaviour began when he was allowed to stay up to watch a results show on television at the 1964 election. The son of a construction worker and a part-time market researcher, he was privately educated at Truro School from 1965 to 1972, and the University of Oxford where he was an undergraduate student and choral scholar at Magdalen College, Oxford reading philosophy, politics and economics (PPE) and graduating in 1976. He was a contemporary of Tony Blair but described the transition to Oxford as "fairly challenging, coming from a working-class background".

== Career ==
From 1981 to 1983 Curtice was a research fellow at Nuffield College, Oxford. Curtice was appointed as a lecturer at the University of Liverpool from 1983 to 1988, then a lecturer and senior lecturer at the University of Strathclyde from 1988 to 1997 before being promoted to Professor in 1998.

Curtice serves as president of the British Polling Council, vice-chair of the Economic and Social Data Service's Advisory Committee and is a member of the editorial board of the Journal of Elections, the Executive Committee of the British Politics Section of the American Political Science Association, and the Policy Advisory Committee of the Institute for Public Policy Research. He was formerly a Fellow at the Netherlands Institute for Advanced Study and a member of the steering committee of the Comparative Study of Electoral Systems project.

Curtice has frequently appeared on BBC News during broadcast coverage of general elections in the United Kingdom, giving his predictions of the results in 2005, 2010, 2015 and 2017. With David Firth he developed the methodology for the exit poll estimation used in the general election coverage. He has picked up a strong following on social media, and was mentioned frequently on Twitter during the 2017 election, though he shuns this attention, adding "I've no wish to become a media celebrity".

=== Books ===
Curtice is an author and co-author of several books including:

- British Social Attitudes: the 24th report (ed. with A. Park, K. Thomson, M. Phillips, M. Johnson and E. Clery), London: Sage, 2008
- British Social Attitudes: the 25th report (ed. with A. Park, K. Thomson, M. Phillips, and E. Clery), London: Sage, 2009
- Has Devolution Worked? (ed. with B. Seyd), Manchester: Manchester University Press, 2009
- Revolution or Evolution?: The 2007 Scottish Elections, (with D. McCrone, N. McEwen, M. Marsh and R.Ormston), Edinburgh: Edinburgh University Press, 2009
- British Social Attitudes: the 26th report (ed. with A. Park, K. Thomson, M Phillips, and E. Clery), London: Sage, 2010.
- British Social Attitudes: the 27th report (ed. with A. Park, E. Clery and C. Bryson), London: Sage, 2010

=== Awards and honours ===
Curtice was elected Fellow of the Royal Society of Arts (FRSA) in 1992 and a Fellow of the Royal Society of Edinburgh (FRSE) in 2004. In 2014 he was elected a Fellow of the British Academy (FBA), the United Kingdom's national academy for the humanities and social sciences. In 2017, he was elected an honorary fellow of the Royal Statistical Society. He is also a Fellow of the Academy of Social Sciences (FAcSS). Curtice was appointed a Knight Bachelor in the 2018 New Year Honours for services to the Social Sciences and Politics.

== Personal life ==
Curtice married Lisa Joan Riding in 1978. She is a social scientist who later retrained as a priest in the Scottish Episcopal Church. They have one daughter and two granddaughters. Their daughter, Ruth Curtice, is the chief executive of the Resolution Foundation.

Curtice is a member of the National Liberal Club. Curtice and Riding previously lived in the West End district of Glasgow but have since moved to Port Glasgow in Inverclyde due to Riding becoming the new rector of St Mary's Episcopal Church.
