= Donald Francis Roy =

Donald Francis Roy (1909–1980) was a sociologist on the faculty of Duke University from 1950 to 1979. Well known for his field work into industrial working conditions, workplace interactions, social conflict, and the role of unions. Roy received a bachelor's degree and master's from the University of Washington where he did ethnographic fieldwork in a Seattle shantytown and his PhD from the University of Chicago. Roy's work surveys much of blue-collar America (beginning in 1934 he took employment in around 24 "bottom rung" jobs in 20 industries), and is of great importance to Marxist analysis of the time.

He is known for an influential series of papers arising from his PhD examining piecework in a machine shop in Chicago—coincidentally, the same shop that was the site for the research for Manufacturing Consent 30 years later.

== Banana Time ==
One of Roy's best-known articles is a paper entitled Banana Time published in Human Organization in 1959. Banana Time has become one of the most highly cited ethnographic studies papers in organizations and industrial sociology. Banana Time describes Roy's experience working in a factory. The paper describes how industrial workers made work and workplaces more tolerable by building relationships and engaging in off-task acts of camaraderie to break up the day. Roy describes a series of different "times" throughout the day that signal very short breaks and that acted as markers throughout the monotonous workday. Of these, banana time, was a point each morning when a banana would be stolen from one workers lunch box and a predictable, but entertaining, interplay would ensue.
