= Donald Whatley Roy =

British physician

Donald Whatley Roy

Donald Whatley Roy FRCS FRCOG (22 May 1881 – 9 December 1960) was a British obstetrician and gynaecologist at St George's Hospital, London.

== Early life and education ==
He was born at Appleton Roebuck on 22 May 1881, the son of the Rev. James Roy.

He attended Sidney Sussex College, Cambridge. He won a university scholarship to St. George's Hospital, qualifying in medicine in 1906 and graduating (M.B., B.Ch.) in 1907. He became a Fellow of the Royal College of Surgeons of England on 8 June 1908.

== Military career ==
When World War I broke out, he served as a Navy surgeon in the Grand Fleet with the Royal Naval Volunteer Reserve. He then transferred to the Royal Army Medical Corps, serving as temporary major at the Northampton War Hospital from 1917 to 1918.

== Medical career ==
He returned to London and was appointed to the consulting staff of St George's Hospital, where he worked for the rest of his professional life.

He also served as physician to the General Lying-in Hospital and Samaritan Hospital for Women.

He was a member of the Board of Advanced Studies and senior examiner in obstetrics and gynecology at University of London. He served as examiner for Cambridge University, Worshipful Society of Apothecaries and the English Conjoint Board. He also served as secretary and vice-president of the Section of Obstetrics and Gynaecology of the Royal Society of Medicine.

He was made a foundation fellow of the Royal College of Obstetricians and Gynaecologists in 1929 He also was librarian of the College from 1 October 1937 to 25 January 1941, when he stepped down due to ill health.

He died on 9 December 1960, and was survived by his wife and three children, one of whom was the economist A.D. Roy.

His papers are held at the Royal College of Obstetricians and Gynaecologists Archives.
