= Multivariate probit model =

In statistics and econometrics, the multivariate probit model is a generalization of the probit model used to estimate several correlated binary outcomes jointly. For example, if it is believed that the decisions of sending at least one child to public school and that of voting in favor of a school budget are correlated (both decisions are binary), then the multivariate probit model would be appropriate for jointly predicting these two choices on an individual-specific basis. J.R. Ashford and R.R. Sowden initially proposed an approach for multivariate probit analysis. Siddhartha Chib and Edward Greenberg extended this idea and also proposed simulation-based inference methods for the multivariate probit model which simplified and generalized parameter estimation.

== Example: bivariate probit ==
In the ordinary probit model, there is only one binary dependent variable $Y$ and so only one latent variable $Y^*$ is used. In contrast, in the bivariate probit model there are two binary dependent variables $Y_1$ and $Y_2$, so there are two latent variables: $Y^*_1$ and $Y^*_2$. It is assumed that each observed variable takes on the value 1 if and only if its underlying continuous latent variable takes on a positive value:

$$Y_1 = \begin{cases} 1 & \text{if }Y^*_1>0, \\
0 & \text{otherwise},
\end{cases}$$

$$Y_2 = \begin{cases}
1 & \text{if }Y^*_2>0, \\
0 & \text{otherwise},
\end{cases}$$

with

$$\begin{cases}
Y_1^* = X_1\beta_1+\varepsilon_1 \\
Y_2^* = X_2\beta_2+\varepsilon_2
\end{cases}$$

and

$$\begin{bmatrix}
\varepsilon_1\\
\varepsilon_2
\end{bmatrix}
\mid X
\sim \mathcal{N}
\left(
\begin{bmatrix}
0\\
0
\end{bmatrix},
\begin{bmatrix}
1&\rho\\
\rho&1
\end{bmatrix}
\right)$$

Fitting the bivariate probit model involves estimating the values of $\beta_1,\ \beta_2,$ and $\rho$. To do so, the likelihood of the model has to be maximized. This likelihood is

$$\begin{align}
L(\beta_1,\beta_2) =\Big( \prod & P(Y_1=1,Y_2=1\mid\beta_1,\beta_2)^{Y_1Y_2} P(Y_1=0,Y_2=1\mid\beta_1,\beta_2)^{(1-Y_1)Y_2} \\[8pt]
& {}\qquad P(Y_1=1,Y_2=0\mid\beta_1,\beta_2)^{Y_1(1-Y_2)}
P(Y_1=0,Y_2=0\mid\beta_1,\beta_2)^{(1-Y_1)(1-Y_2)} \Big)
\end{align}$$

Substituting the latent variables $Y_1^*$ and $Y_2^*$ in the probability functions and taking logs gives

$$\begin{align}
\sum & \Big( Y_1Y_2 \ln P(\varepsilon_1>-X_1\beta_1,\varepsilon_2>-X_2\beta_2) \\[4pt]
& {}\quad{}+(1-Y_1)Y_2\ln P(\varepsilon_1<-X_1\beta_1,\varepsilon_2>-X_2\beta_2) \\[4pt]
& {}\quad{}+Y_1(1-Y_2)\ln P(\varepsilon_1>-X_1\beta_1,\varepsilon_2<-X_2\beta_2) \\[4pt]
& {}\quad{}+(1-Y_1)(1-Y_2)\ln P(\varepsilon_1<-X_1\beta_1,\varepsilon_2<-X_2\beta_2) \Big).
\end{align}$$

After some rewriting, the log-likelihood function becomes:

$$\begin{align}
\sum & \Big ( Y_1Y_2\ln \Phi(X_1\beta_1,X_2\beta_2,\rho) \\[4pt]
& {}\quad{} + (1-Y_1)Y_2\ln \Phi(-X_1\beta_1,X_2\beta_2,-\rho) \\[4pt]
& {}\quad{} + Y_1(1-Y_2)\ln \Phi(X_1\beta_1,-X_2\beta_2,-\rho) \\[4pt]
& {}\quad{} +(1-Y_1)(1-Y_2)\ln \Phi(-X_1\beta_1,-X_2\beta_2,\rho) \Big).
\end{align}$$

Note that $\Phi$ is the cumulative distribution function of the bivariate normal distribution. $Y_1$ and $Y_2$ in the log-likelihood function are observed variables being equal to one or zero.

== Multivariate Probit ==
For the general case, $\mathbf{y_i} = (y_1, ..., y_j), \ (i = 1,...,N)$ where we can take $j$ as choices and $i$ as individuals or observations, the probability of observing choice $\mathbf{y_i}$ is

$$\begin{align}
\Pr(\mathbf{y_i}|\mathbf{X_i\beta}, \Sigma) = & \int_{A_J}\cdots\int_{A_1}f_N(\mathbf{y}^*_i|\mathbf{X_i\beta}, \Sigma) dy^*_1\dots dy^*_J \\
\Pr(\mathbf{y_i}|\mathbf{X_i\beta}, \Sigma) = & \int \mathbb{1}_{y^* \in A} f_N(\mathbf{y}^*_i|\mathbf{X_i\beta}, \Sigma) d\mathbf{y}^*_i
\end{align}$$

Where $A = A_1 \times \cdots \times A_J$ and,

$$A_j = \begin{cases} (-\infty,0] & y_j = 0 \\
(0, \infty) &  y_j = 1 \end{cases}$$

The log-likelihood function in this case would be $\sum_{i=1}^N \log\Pr(\mathbf{y_i}|\mathbf{X_i\beta}, \Sigma)$

Except for $J\leq2$ typically there is no closed form solution to the integrals in the log-likelihood equation. Instead simulation methods can be used to simulated the choice probabilities. Methods using importance sampling include the GHK algorithm, AR (accept-reject), Stern's method. There are also MCMC approaches to this problem including CRB (Chib's method with Rao–Blackwellization), CRT (Chib, Ritter, Tanner), ARK (accept-reject kernel), and ASK (adaptive sampling kernel). A variational approach scaling to large datasets is proposed in Probit-LMM.

The Multivariate Probit Model has been applied to simultaneously analyze consumer choice of multiple brands. It has been demonstrated that the Multivariate Probit model extends research possibilities in the demand area by relaxing the restrictive assumption of mutually exclusive alternatives, which characterizes multinomial discrete choice methods.
