= Self-selection bias =

Type of sampling bias

In statistics, self-selection bias arises in any situation in which individuals select themselves into a group, causing a biased sample with nonprobability sampling. It is commonly used to describe situations where the characteristics of the people which cause them to select themselves in the group create abnormal or undesirable conditions in the group. It is closely related to the non-response bias, describing when the group of people responding has different responses than the group of people not responding.

Self-selection bias is a major problem in research in sociology, psychology, economics and many other social sciences. In such fields, a poll suffering from such bias is termed a self-selected listener opinion poll or "SLOP". The term is also used in criminology to describe the process by which specific predispositions may lead an offender to choose a criminal career and lifestyle.

While the effects of self-selection bias are closely related to those of selection bias, the problem arises for rather different reasons; thus there may be a purposeful intent on the part of respondents leading to self-selection bias whereas other types of selection bias may arise more inadvertently, possibly as the result of mistakes by those designing any given study.

== Explanation ==
Self-selection makes determination of causation more difficult. For example, when attempting to assess the effect of a test preparation course in increasing participant's test scores, significantly higher test scores might be observed among students who choose to participate in the preparation course itself. Due to self-selection, there may be a number of differences between the people who choose to take the course and those who choose not to, such as motivation, socioeconomic status, or prior test-taking experience. Due to self-selection according to such factors, a significant difference in mean test scores could be observed between the two populations independent of any ability of the course to affect test scores. An outcome might be that those who elect to do the preparation course would have achieved higher scores in the actual test anyway. If the study measures an improvement in absolute test scores due to participation in the preparation course, they may be skewed to show a higher effect. A relative measure of 'improvement' might improve the reliability of the study somewhat, but only partially.

Self-selection bias causes problems for research about programs or products. In particular, self-selection affects evaluation of whether or not a given program has some effect, and complicates interpretation of market research.

The Roy model provides one of the earliest academic illustrations of the self-selection problem.

== See also ==
- Convenience sampling
- Sampling bias
- Selection bias
