= James Heckman =

American economist (born 1944)

- Born: James Joseph Heckman; April 19, 1944 (age 82); Chicago, Illinois, US

Academic background
- Education: Colorado College (BA); Princeton University (PhD)
- Thesis: Three Essays on the Supply of Labor and the Demand for Goods (1971)
- Doctoral advisors: Harry H. Kelejian; Stanley Warren Black
- Influences: Albert Rees; Gary Becker; Jacob Mincer

Academic work
- Discipline: Microeconomics
- School or tradition: Chicago School of Economics
- Institutions: University of Chicago; University of Southern California; Columbia University; Chinese University of Hong Kong
- Doctoral students: Carolyn Heinrich; George Borjas; Petra Todd; Stephen Cameron; Mark Rosenzweig; Russ Roberts
- Notable ideas: Heckman correction
- Awards: John Bates Clark Medal (1983); Nobel Memorial Prize in Economics (2000); Frisch Medal (2014); Dan David Prize (2016)

James Joseph Heckman (born April 19, 1944) is an American economist and Nobel laureate who serves as the Henry Schultz Distinguished Service Professor in Economics at the University of Chicago, where he is also a professor at the college, a professor at the Harris School of Public Policy, Director of the Center for the Economics of Human Development (CEHD), and co-director of Human Capital and Economic Opportunity (HCEO) Global Working Group. He is also a professor of law at the Law School, a senior research fellow at the American Bar Foundation, and a research associate at the NBER. He received the John Bates Clark Medal in 1983, and the Nobel Memorial Prize in Economic Sciences in 2000, which he shared with Daniel McFadden. He is known principally for his pioneering work in econometrics and microeconomics.

Heckman is noted for his contributions to selection bias and self-selection in quantitative analysis in the social sciences, especially the Heckman correction, which earned him the Nobel Prize in Economics. He is also well known for his empirical research in labor economics and his scholarship on the efficacy of early childhood education programs. As of June 2024, according to RePEc, he is the third-most influential economist in the world.

== Early years ==
Heckman was born to John Jacob Heckman and Bernice Irene Medley in Chicago, Illinois. He received his B.A. in mathematics from Colorado College in 1965 and his Ph.D. in economics from Princeton University in 1971 after completing a doctoral dissertation titled "Three essays on the supply of labor and the demand for goods" under the supervision of Stanley W. Black.

== Career ==
He served as an assistant professor at Columbia University before he moved to the University of Chicago, in 1973. He has been a dissertation advisor for over 70 students, including Carolyn Heinrich, George Borjas, Stephen Cameron, Mark Rosenzweig, and Russ Roberts.

In addition to serving as the Henry Schultz Distinguished Service Professor and director of the Economics Research Center in the department of economics, Heckman is also a professor of law at the Law School and a professor at the Harris School of Public Policy, where he is director of both the Center for Social Program Evaluation and Center for the Study of Childhood Development. He also serves as a member of the Becker Friedman Institute for Research in Economics's Research Council. Heckman has held many appointments at other institutions and notably served as the Distinguished Chair of Microeconometrics at University College London (2004–2008), a professor of Science and Society at University College Dublin (2005–2014), and as the Alfred Cowles Distinguished Visiting Professor at Yale University (2008–2011). His current appointments include Presidential Scholar-in-Residence at the University of Southern California's Leonard D. Schaeffer Center for Health Policy and Economics (2015–) and International Research Fellow at the Institute for Fiscal Studies (2014–).

=== Center for the Economics of Human Development ===
Founded in 2014 and directed by Heckman, the Center for the Economics of Human Development (CEHD), at the University of Chicago, umbrellas his multiple research areas and initiatives that encompass rigorous empirical research to determine effective human capital policies and program design. CEHD initiatives include the Human Capital and Economic Opportunity Global Working Group, the Pritzker Consortium on Early Childhood Development, the Heckman Equation, the Research Network on the Determinants of Life Course Capabilities and Outcomes, and the Asian Family in Transition Initiative.

== Research ==
Heckman is noted for his contributions to selection bias and self-selection analysis, especially Heckman correction, which earned him the Nobel Prize in Economics. He is also well known for his empirical research in labor economics, particularly regarding the efficacy of early childhood education programs.

His work has been devoted to the development of a scientific basis for economic policy evaluation, with special emphasis on models of individuals and disaggregated groups, and the problems and possibilities created by heterogeneity, diversity, and unobserved counterfactual states. He developed a body of new econometric tools that address these issues. His research has given policymakers important new insights into areas such as education, jobtraining, the importance of accounting for general equilibrium in the analysis of labor markets, anti-discrimination law, and civil rights. He demonstrated a strong causal effect of the Civil Rights Act of 1964 in promoting African-American economic progress. He has recently demonstrated that the high school dropout rate is increasing in the US. He has studied the economic benefits of sorting in the labor market, the ineffectiveness of active labor market programs, and the economic returns to education.

His recent research focuses on inequality, human development and lifecycle skill formation, with a special emphasis on the economics of early childhood education. He is currently conducting new social experiments on early childhood interventions and reanalyzing old experiments. He is also studying the emergence of the underclass in the US and Western Europe. For example, he showed that a high IQ only improved an individual's chances of financial success by 1 or 2%. Instead, "conscientiousness," or "diligence, perseverance and self-discipline," are what led to financial success.

In the early 1990s, his pioneering research on the outcomes of people who obtain the GED certificate received national attention.

Heckman has published over 300 articles and several books. His books include Inequality in America: What Role for Human Capital Policy? (with Alan Krueger); Evaluating Human Capital Policy, Law, and Employment: Lessons from Latin America and the Caribbean (with Carmen Pages); the Handbook of Econometrics, volumes 5, 6A, and 6B (edited with Edward Leamer); Global Perspectives on the Rule of Law, (edited with R. Nelson and L. Cabatingan); and The Myth of Achievement Tests: The GED and the Role of Character in American Life (with John Eric Humphries and Tim Kautz).

He is currently co-editor of the Journal of Political Economy. He is also a member of the National Academy of Sciences (USA) and the American Philosophical Society. He is a fellow of the American Academy of Arts and Sciences, the Econometric Society (of which he is also former president), the Society of Labor Economics, the American Statistical Association, and the International Statistical Institute.

== Awards ==
Heckman has received numerous awards for his work, including the John Bates Clark Medal of the American Economic Association in 1983, the 2005 and 2007 Dennis Aigner Award for Applied Econometrics from the Journal of Econometrics, the 2005 Jacob Mincer Award for Lifetime Achievement in Labor Economics, the 2005 Ulysses Medal from the University College Dublin, the 2007 Theodore W. Schultz Award from the American Agricultural Economics Association, the Gold Medal of the President of the Italian Republic awarded by the International Scientific Committee of the Pio Manzú Centre in 2008, the Distinguished Contributions to Public Policy for Children Award from the Society for Research in Child Development in 2009, the 2014 Frisch Medal from the Econometric Society, the 2014 Spirit of Erikson Award from the Erikson Institute, and the 2016 Dan David Prize for Combating Poverty.

== Personal life ==
Heckman in 1979 married sociologist Lynne Pettler-Heckman, who died July 8, 2017. They had two children

== See also ==
- List of economists
- List of think tanks

Awards
Preceded by Robert A. Mundell	Laureate of the Nobel Memorial Prize in Economics; 2000; Served alongside: Daniel L. McFadden	Succeeded by George A. Akerlof; Michael Spence; Joseph E. Stiglitz
