= Prospero (disambiguation) =

Prospero is the protagonist of The Tempest, a play by William Shakespeare.

Prospero may also refer to:

== Given name ==
- Philip Prospero, Prince of Asturias (1657–1661), Spanish heir apparent and son of Philip IV of Spain and Mariana of Austria
- Pope Benedict XIV (1675–1758), born Prospero Lorenzo Lambertini
- Prospero Alpini (1553–1617), Venetian physician and botanist
- Prospero Amatong (1931–2009), Philippine politician and member of the House of Representatives
- Prospero Caterini (1795–1881), Italian Roman Catholic cardinal
- Prospero Colonna (1452–1523), Italian condottiere
- Prospero Colonna (cardinal) (died 1463), cardinal-nephew of Pope Martin V
- Prospero Colonna (politician), mayor of Rome in 1899–1904
- Prospero Colonna di Sciarra (1707–1765), Italian cardinal
- Prospero Fagnani (died 1678), Italian canon lawyer
- Prospero Farinacci (1554–1618), Italian lawyer and judge, noted for his harsh sentencing
- Prospero Fontana (1512–1597), Italian painter of the late Renaissance
- Prospero Gallinari (1951–2013), Italian terrorist and member of the Red Brigades
- Prospero Grech (1925–2019), Augustinian friar and cardinal
- Prospero Intorcetta (1626–1696), Jesuit missionary in China
- Prospero Nograles (1947–2019), speaker of the House of Representatives of the Philippines
- Prospero Pichay Jr. (born 1950), Philippine politician and former member of the Philippine House of Representatives
- Prospero Rabaglio, late 16th-century Italian painter
- Prospero Santacroce (1514–1589), Italian Roman Catholic bishop and cardinal
- Prospero Spani (1516–1584), Italian sculptor a.k.a. Prospero Clementi, Prospero Clemente or il Clemente
- Prospero Zannichelli (1698–1772), Italian painter
- Próspero Fernández Oreamuno (1834–1885), President of Costa Rica (1882–1885)
- Próspero París (1846–1931), French Roman Catholic prelate and Apostolic Vicar of Nanking
- Próspero Penados del Barrio (1925–2005), Guatemalan Roman Catholic prelate and Archbishop of Guatemala City
- San Prospero di Reggio Emilia a.k.a. Prosper of Reggio (died 466 AD), Italian saint

== Fictional characters ==
- Prince Prospero, the protagonist of Edgar Allan Poe's "The Masque of the Red Death"
- Prospero, the wizard protagonist of John Bellairs' novel The Face in the Frost
- Prospero the Gunsmith, a character from the book The Three Fat Men
- Prospero "Perry" Usher, a character in the 2023 Netflix series The Fall of the House of Usher

== Science and technology ==
- PROX1, which stands for Prospero homeobox protein 1
- Prospero (moon), a moon of the planet Uranus
- Prospero (plant), a genus of plants in the family Asparagaceae
- Prospero (satellite), launched by the United Kingdom in 1971
- PROSPERO, a database for the prospective registration of studies in medicine, social care, welfare, crime, justice and international development studies

== Other ==
- HMS Prospero
- Prospero, the home planet of the Thousand Sons traitor legion in Warhammer 40,000
- Prospero, a canceled video game by Valve Corporation
- Prospero (mountain), mountain in Australia
- Prospero Productions, an Australian-based television production company

== See also ==
- Prosper (disambiguation)
- Prospero Colonna (disambiguation)
