= IDP =

IDP may refer to:

== Organizations ==
- IDP Education, an educational organization based in Australia
- Independent Democratic Party (disambiguation)
- Interac Direct Payment, Canada's national debit card service
- International Dunhuang Project
- Intern Development Program, a training program for interns in the architecture profession
- Iowa Democratic Party, affiliate of United States Democratic Party in Iowa
- Islamic Dawa Party (Iraq)
- Islamic Democratic Party (Maldives)
- Islamic Democratic Party (Rwanda)
- Democratic and Progressive Italy, an electoral alliance in Italy

== Technology ==
- Identity provider (IdP), the source for validating user identity in a federated identity system
- Initial detection point (telephony)
- Internal DisplayPort (iDP)
- Intelligent document processing
- International dialing prefix
- Intrusion detection and prevention system
- Internet Datagram Protocol, a network-layer protocol used in Xerox Network Systems

== Other uses ==
- Independence (Amtrak station) code for Independence, Missouri, United States
- Individual defensive players, a fantasy football format
- Individual development plan, a human resources term
- Internally displaced person
- Intrinsically disordered proteins
- International Driving Permit

== See also ==
- IPD (disambiguation)
