= Pearling =

Pearling may refer to:

== Relating to actual pearls ==
- Pearl farming, which creates cultured pearls
- Pearl hunting, the practice of diving for pearls and mother of pearl (nacre)
- Pearling in Western Australia, which covers both pearl hunting and pearl farming

== Other uses ==
- Pearling, a decorative metal surface finishing technique
- Pearling (body modification), a form of genital beading
- Pearl growing, a search method where the information in one article is used to find further relevant articles on a subject
- An alternative spelling for purling, a term in knitting
- Debranning, removing the bran of pearl millet

== See also ==
- Mother of pearl (nacre), the iridescent substance of which pearls and the inner layer of some shells are composed
