= IPD =

IPD may refer to:

== Medicine ==
- Idiopathic Parkinson's disease
- Impulsive personality disorder
- In-patient department
- Inter-pupillary distance, the distance between the center of the pupils of the two eyes
- Invasive pneumococcal disease

== Organizations ==
- International Product Development, also known as IPD USA or IPD Volvo, is a USA-based manufacturer and seller of automotive parts for Volvo cars, such as the Volvo C30
- Initiative for Policy Dialogue, an organization based at Columbia University
- Chartered Institute of Personnel and Development, a professional association for human resource management professionals
- Instituto Peruano del Deporte, a government entity in Peru

== Police departments ==
- Indianapolis Police Department, former police department of Indianapolis and preceding agency of the Indianapolis Metropolitan Police Department
- Independence Police Department (Missouri), police department of Independence, Missouri
- Inglewood Police Department, Inglewood, California
- Irvington Police Department, police department of Irvington, New Jersey

== Other uses ==
- Initial professional development
- Independence Day (1996 film), a 1996 American science fiction disaster film
- Integrated passive devices
- Iterated prisoner's dilemma, in game theory
- Integrated powerhead demonstrator, a rocket engine
- Integrated project delivery, a construction project delivery method
- Individual participant data, a method for conducting a meta-analysis

== See also ==
- IDP (disambiguation)
