= Doubt =

Status between belief and disbelief

Doubt is a mental state in which the mind remains suspended between two or more contradictory propositions, and is uncertain about them. Doubt on an emotional level is indecision between belief and disbelief. It may involve uncertainty, distrust or lack of conviction on certain facts, actions, motives, or decisions. Doubt can result in delaying or rejecting relevant action out of concern for mistakes or missed opportunities.

== Psychology ==
Partial or intermittent negative reinforcement can create an effective climate of fear and doubt.

== Philosophy ==
Descartes employed Cartesian doubt as a pre-eminent methodological tool in his fundamental philosophical investigations. Branches of philosophy like logic devote much effort to distinguish the dubious, the probable and the certain. Much of illogic rests on dubious assumptions, dubious data or dubious conclusions, with rhetoric, whitewashing, and deception playing their accustomed roles.

In his posthumous work On Certainty (OC), Ludwig Wittgenstein describes how our everyday use of the words ‘doubt’ and ‘certainty’ function. The two concepts are interwoven into our daily lives such that if we cannot be certain of any fact, then we cannot be certain of the meaning of our words either. (OC §114).

== Theology ==
The Incredulity of Saint Thomas by Caravaggio.

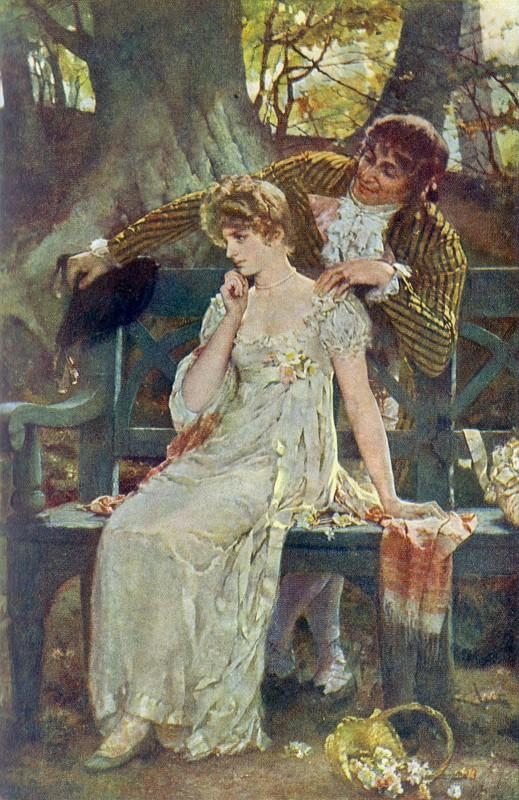
Doubts, by Henrietta Rae, 1886

Doubt as a path towards (deeper) belief lies at the heart of the story of Saint Thomas the Apostle. Note in this respect the theological views of Georg Hermes:

... the starting-point and chief principle of every science, and hence of theology also, is not only methodical doubt, but positive doubt. One can believe only what one has perceived to be true from reasonable grounds, and consequently one must have the courage to continue doubting until one has found reliable grounds to satisfy the reason.

Doubt that god(s) exist may form the basis of agnosticism — the belief that one cannot determine the existence or non-existence of god(s). It may also form other brands of skepticism, such as Pyrrhonism, which do not take a positive stance in regard to the existence of god(s), but remain negative. Alternatively, doubt over the existence of god(s) may lead to acceptance of a particular religion: compare Pascal's Wager. Doubt of a specific theology, scriptural or deistic, may bring into question the truth of that theology's set of beliefs. On the other hand, doubt as to some doctrines but acceptance of others may lead to the growth of heresy and/or the splitting off of sects or groups of thought. Thus proto-Protestants doubted papal authority, and substituted alternative methods of governance in their new (but still recognizably similar) churches.

Christian existentialists such as Søren Kierkegaard suggest that for one to truly have belief in God, one would also have to doubt one's beliefs about God; the doubt is the rational part of a person's thought involved in weighing evidence, without which the belief would have no real substance. Belief is not a decision based on evidence that, say, certain beliefs about God are true or a certain person is worthy of love. No such evidence could ever be enough to pragmatically justify the kind of total commitment involved in true theological belief or romantic love. Belief involves making that commitment anyway. Kierkegaard thought that to have belief is at the same time to have doubt.

== Law ==
Most criminal cases within an adversarial system require that the prosecution proves its contentions beyond a reasonable doubt — a doctrine also called the "burden of proof". This means that the State must present propositions which preclude "reasonable doubt" in the mind of a reasonable person as to the guilt of defendant. Some doubt may persist, but only to the extent that it would not affect a "reasonable person's" belief in the defendant's guilt. If the doubt raised does affect a "reasonable person's" belief, the jury is not satisfied beyond a "reasonable doubt". The jurisprudence of the applicable jurisdiction usually defines the precise meaning of words such as "reasonable" and "doubt" for such purposes.

== Science ==
To doubt everything or to believe everything are two equally convenient solutions; both dispense with the necessity of reflection.

—Henri Poincaré, Science and Hypothesis (1905) (from Dover abridged edition of 1952)

The scientific method regularly quantifies doubt, and uses it to determine whether further research is needed. Isaac Asimov, in his 1962 essay collection Fact and Fancy, described science as a system for causing and resolving intelligent doubt.

Charles Peirce saw doubt as the starting point of any scientific investigation. Karl Popper deployed scientific doubt as an essential tool: scientists working in the Popperian paradigm doubt any theory so thoroughly that they strive to falsify that theory.

== See also ==
- Ambiguity
- Doubting Thomas
- Fear, uncertainty and doubt
- Further research is needed
- List of ethics topics
- Methodic doubt
- Philosophical skepticism
- Question
- Reasonable doubt
- Skepticism
