= Galbraith plot =

Statistical device

In statistics, a Galbraith plot (also known as Galbraith's radial plot or just radial plot) is one way of displaying several estimates of the same quantity that have different standard errors.

Example for Galbraith's radial plot (A) and a variant of it, the Abanico plot (B) .

It can be used to examine heterogeneity in a meta-analysis, as an alternative or supplement to a forest plot.

A Galbraith plot is produced by first calculating the standardized estimates or z-statistics by dividing each estimate by its standard error (SE). The Galbraith plot is then a scatter plot of each z-statistic (vertical axis) against 1/SE (horizontal axis). Larger studies (with smaller SE and larger 1/SE) will be observed to aggregate away from the origin.

== See also ==
- Plot
- Funnel plot
