= Matthias Egger =

American psychologist

- Education: London School of Hygiene & Tropical Medicine, University of Bern
- Known for: Meta-analysis, public health
- Scientific career
- Fields: Epidemiology, Statistics
- Workplaces: University of Bern

Matthias Egger is professor of epidemiology and public health at the University of Bern in Switzerland, as well as professor of clinical epidemiology at the University of Bristol in the United Kingdom.

== Education and career ==
Egger completed his clinical training at the University of Bern and the London School of Hygiene & Tropical Medicine. He joined the faculty of the University of Bern in 2002, and also became a professor at the University of Bristol that year. From 2017 to 2024, Matthias Egger was president of the Research Council of the Swiss National Science Foundation.

== Scientific work ==
In 1997, Egger published a paper describing a method for detecting bias in meta-analyses by analyzing funnel plots. This paper has been cited more than 38,600 times on Google Scholar as of May 2022.

In 2005, Egger published a study comparing 110 trials of homeopathy with 110 trials of conventional medicine in the Lancet. It found that there was strong evidence that conventional medicine was more effective than placebo, but only weak evidence that homeopathy was. Egger told WebMD that in this study, "The effect of homeopathy disappears if you look only at large, good trials; whereas the conventional medicines' effect is still there."

Egger has also published research on a wide variety of other medical topics, such as the demographics of people who choose assisted suicide, the association between exposure to aircraft noise and heart attacks, and the effectiveness of pneumococcal polysaccharide vaccines.

== Other activities ==
- Geneva Science and Diplomacy Anticipator (GESDA), Member of the Board of Directors (since 2020)
