= Funnel plot =

Type of graph used in research

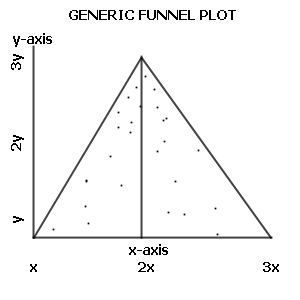
An example funnel plot showing no publication bias. Each dot represents a study (e.g. measuring the effect of a certain drug); the y-axis represents study precision (e.g. the inverse standard error or number of experimental subjects) and the x-axis shows the study's result (e.g. the drug's measured average effect).

A funnel plot is a graph designed to check for the existence of publication bias; funnel plots are commonly used in systematic reviews and meta-analyses. In the absence of publication bias, it assumes that studies with high precision will be plotted near the average, and studies with low precision will be spread evenly on both sides of the average, creating a roughly funnel-shaped distribution. Deviation from this shape can indicate publication bias.

== Quotation ==
Funnel plots, introduced by Light and Pillemer in 1984 and discussed in detail by Matthias Egger and colleagues, are useful adjuncts to meta-analyses. A funnel plot is a scatterplot of treatment effect against a measure of study precision. It is used primarily as a visual aid for detecting bias or systematic heterogeneity. A symmetric inverted funnel shape arises from a 'well-behaved' data set, in which publication bias is unlikely. An asymmetric funnel indicates a relationship between treatment effect estimate and study precision. This suggests the possibility of either publication bias or a systematic difference between studies of higher and lower precision (typically 'small study effects'). Asymmetry can also arise from use of an inappropriate effect measure. Whatever the cause, an asymmetric funnel plot leads to doubts over the appropriateness of a simple meta-analysis and suggests that there needs to be investigation of possible causes.

A variety of choices of measures of 'study precision' is available, including total sample size, standard error of the treatment effect, and inverse variance of the treatment effect (weight). Sterne and Egger have compared these with others, and conclude that the standard error is to be recommended. When the standard error is used, straight lines may be drawn to define a region within which 95% of points might lie in the absence of both heterogeneity and publication bias.

In common with confidence interval plots, funnel plots are conventionally drawn with the treatment effect measure on the horizontal axis, so that study precision appears on the vertical axis, breaking with the general rule. Since funnel plots are principally visual aids for detecting asymmetry along the treatment effect axis, this makes them considerably easier to interpret.

== Criticism ==
The funnel plot is not without problems. If high-precision studies are different from low-precision studies with respect to effect size (e.g., due to different populations examined) a funnel plot may give a wrong impression of publication bias. The appearance of the funnel plot can change quite dramatically depending on the scale on the y-axis — whether it is the inverse square error or the trial size. Researchers have a poor ability to visually discern publication bias from funnel plots.

== See also ==
- Galbraith plot
- Forest plot
- Systematic review
