= Prospero Colonna (disambiguation) =

Prospero Colonna may refer to several members of the Colonna family:

- Prospero I Colonna (c. 1410–1463), Italian Roman Catholic cardinal
- Prospero II Colonna (1662–1743), Italian Roman Catholic cardinal
- Prospero Colonna (condottiero) (1452–1523)
- Prospero Colonna di Sciarra (1707–1765)
- Prospero Colonna di Paliano, mayor of Rome in 1899–1904
