= Further research is needed =

Phrase commonly used in research papers

A blobbogram is designed to show whether further research is needed. Studies crossing the vertical line are inconclusive. Here the summary (bottom diamond) shows that the treatment prevented babies from dying. Further studies like these are not needed.

"Further research is needed" (FRIN), "more research is needed" and other variants of similar phrases are commonly used in research papers. The cliché is so common that it has attracted research, regulation and cultural commentary.

== Meaning ==
Some research journals have banned the phrase "more research is needed" on the grounds that it is redundant; it is almost always true and fits almost any article, and so can be taken as understood.

A 2004 metareview by the Cochrane collaboration of their own systematic medical reviews found that 93% of the reviews studied made indiscriminate FRIN-like statements, reducing their ability to guide future research. The presence of FRIN had no correlation with the strength of the evidence against the medical intervention. Authors who thought a treatment was useless were just as likely to recommend researching it further.

Indeed, authors may recommend "further research" when, given the existing evidence, further research would be extremely unlikely to be approved by an ethics committee.

Studies finding that a treatment has no noticeable effects are sometimes greeted with statements that "more research is needed" by those convinced that the treatment is effective, but the effect has not yet been found. Since even the largest study can never rule out an infinitesimal effect, an effect can only ever be shown to be insignificant, not non-existent. Similarly, Trish Greenhalgh, Professor of Primary Care Health Sciences at the University of Oxford, argues that FRIN is often used as a way in which a "[l]ack of hard evidence to support the original hypothesis gets reframed as evidence that investment efforts need to be redoubled", and a way to avoid upsetting hopes and vested interests. She has also described FRIN as "an indicator that serious scholarly thinking on the topic has ceased", saying that "it is almost never the only logical conclusion that can be drawn from a set of negative, ambiguous, incomplete or contradictory data."

== Addressing the phrase ==
Greenhalgh suggests that, because vague FRIN statements are an argument that "tomorrow's research investments should be pitched into precisely the same patch of long grass as yesterday's", funding should be refused to those making them. She and others argue that more thought and research is needed into methods for determining where more research is needed.

Academic journal editors were banning unqualified FRIN statements as early as 1990, requiring more specific information such as what types of research were needed, and what questions they ought to address. Researchers themselves have strongly recommended that research articles detail what research is needed. This is conventional in some fields. Other commentators suggest that articles would benefit by assessing the likely value of possible further research.

== Example ==
Both the needfulness and needlessness of further research may be overlooked. The blobbogram leading this article is from a systematic review; it shows clinical trials of the use of corticosteroids to hasten lung development in pregnancies where a baby is likely to be born prematurely. Long after there was enough evidence to show that this treatment saved babies' lives, the evidence was not widely known, the treatment was not widely used, and further research was done into the same question. After the review made the evidence better known, the treatment was used more, preventing thousands of pre-term babies from dying of infant respiratory distress syndrome.

However, when the treatment was rolled out in lower- and middle-income countries, early data suggested that more pre-term babies died. It was thought that this could be because of a higher risk of infection, which is more likely to kill a baby in places with poor medical care and more malnourished mothers. The 2017 version of the review therefore said that there was "little need" for further research into the usefulness of the treatment in higher-income countries, but further research was needed on optimal dosage and on how to best treat lower-income and higher-risk mothers.

Further research was done, and found the treatment did actually benefit babies in lower-income countries, too. The December 2020 version of the review stated that the "evidence [that the treatment saves babies] is robust, regardless of resource setting (high, middle or low)" and that further research should focus on "specific understudied subgroups such as multiple pregnancies and other high-risk obstetric groups, and the risks and benefits in the very early or very late preterm periods".

== In culture ==
The idea that research papers always end with some variation of FRIN was described as an "old joke" in a 1999 epidemiology editorial.

FRIN has been advocated as a position politicians should take on under-evidenced claims. Requests for further research on questions relevant to political policy can lead to better-informed decisions, but FRIN statements have also been used in bad faith: for instance, to delay political decisions, or as a justification for ignoring existing research knowledge (as was done by nicotine companies). Policymakers may also not know of existing research; they seldom systematically search databases of research literature, preferring to use Google and ask colleagues for research papers.

FRIN has been advocated as a motto for life, applicable everywhere except research papers; it has been printed on T-shirts, and satirized by the "Collectively Unconscious" blog, which reported that an article in the journal Science had concluded that "no further research is needed, at all, anywhere, ever".

== See also ==
- Scientific method
- Working hypothesis
