= Independent Democratic Party =

Independent Democratic Party may refer to:

- Nullifier Party (USA, 1832) (Sometimes called the 'Independent Democratic Party')
- A political party formed mostly by barnburners meeting in Utica, New York, on June 22, 1848
- Democratic Party (UK, 1942)
- Independent Democratic Party (Australia)
- Independent Democratic Party of Russia
- Independent Democratic Party (Yugoslavia)
