= JBI (research organisation) =

For the improvement of healthcare practice and health outcomes

JBI, formerly known as the Joanna Briggs Institute, is an international research organisation which develops and delivers evidence-based information, software, education and training designed to improve healthcare practice and health outcomes. JBI works with universities and hospitals internationally through the JBI Collaboration. The JBI Collaboration is the largest global collaboration to integrate evidence-based healthcare within a theory-informed model that brings together academic entities, hospitals, and health systems. JBI is based in Adelaide, South Australia. The Joanna Briggs Institute changed its name to JBI in 2020. The JBI headquarters now sit within the School of Public Health in the College of Health at Adelaide University.

== Evidence-based healthcare ==
JBI's approach considers the best available evidence, the context in which care is delivered, the individual patient and the professional judgement and expertise of the health professional. JBI regards evidence-based healthcare as a cyclical process. Global healthcare needs, as identified by clinicians or patients/consumers, are addressed through the generation of research evidence that is effective, but also feasible, appropriate and meaningful to specific populations, cultures and settings.

== The JBI Model ==
The JBI Model of Evidence-based Healthcare was developed in 2005 and updated in 2016.

It is described by reference to a pictogram, with one circle inside another. The 'inner circle' represents the pebble of knowledge while the 'inner wedges' provide the organisation's conceptualization of the steps involved in the process of achieving an evidence-based approach to clinical decision-making. The 'outer wedges' operationalise the component parts of the model and articulate how they might be actioned in a pragmatic way. The arrows indicate that the flow can be bi-directional.

== Evidence-based practice resources ==
JBI develops and delivers evidence-based resources, methodologies, software, education, and training to support improvements in healthcare practice and health outcomes. These activities are aligned with the JBI Model of Evidence-based Healthcare, which provides a conceptual framework for translating health evidence into practice. While JBI's early work focused on nursing research, its scope has since expanded to encompass all healthcare disciplines, including allied health, medicine, and public health.

Resources include the JBI Evidence Implementation Manual; JBI Evidence Synthesis Manual (JBI's comprehensive guide to conducting systematic reviews); and Critical Appraisal Tools (includes checklists for randomized control trials, qualitative research, economic evaluations and prevalence studies).

Other evidence-based practice resources and publications, such as JBI SUMARI, can be accessed via JBI's EBP Resources.

== History ==
JBI was established in 1996 by the Royal Adelaide Hospital and the University of Adelaide. The organization takes its name from Joanna Briggs, who was the first matron of the Royal Adelaide Hospital.
