= PROSPERO =

Online systematic review database

The International Prospective Register of Systematic Reviews, better known as PROSPERO, is an open access online database of systematic review protocols on a wide range of topics. While it was initially restricted to medicine, as of 2021, it also accepts protocols in criminology, social care, education and international development, as long as there is a health-related outcome. Researchers can choose to have their reviews prospectively registered with PROSPERO. The database is produced by the Centre for Reviews and Dissemination at the University of York in England, and it is funded by the National Institute for Health Research. Registration of systematic reviews in the database has been supported by PLoS Medicine, BioMed Central, the EQUATOR Network, and BMJ editor-in-chief Fiona Godlee, among others.

== History ==
After the PRISMA statement was published in 2010, the University of York responded to its recommendation for prospective systematic review registration by beginning development of an online database of systematic reviews. The resulting PROSPERO database was launched in February 2011 by Frederick Curzon, 7th Earl Howe, the Parliamentary Under-Secretary of State for Health. It was simultaneously launched at a Vancouver, Canada meeting organized by the Canadian Institutes of Health Research that month. By October 2011, the database included 200 records of systematic reviews that were being conducted at the time. In October 2013, the Cochrane Collaboration began automatically including protocols of its systematic reviews in PROSPERO. By October 10, 2017, the number of registered reviews in the database had increased to 26,535. As of February 27, 2021, there were 106,828 registration records on the platform.

== Responses ==
In 2017, concern was raised that some protocols in PROSPERO could be "zombie reviews" for which the protocol had been registered, but its record in the database had not been updated to indicate that it had been completed. Andrade et al. showed that only 7% of all reviews registered in PROSPERO from 2011 to 2015 had since been marked as "completed". These authors suggested that many of these reviews were either abandoned, meaning they had not been completed or published, or, if they had been completed, had not had their PROSPERO record updated to reflect this. Sideri et al. (2018) showed that orthodontics-related systematic reviews that were registered in PROSPERO were on average of higher methodological quality than those not so registered. Proportion of registration in systems other than PROSPERO in the systematic review protocol is 1% from 2011 to 2020.
