= Individual participant data =

Individual participant data (also known as individual patient data, often abbreviated IPD) is raw data from individual participants, and is often used in the context of meta-analysis.

The International Committee of Medical Journal Editors (ICMJE) has stated that sharing of deidentified individual participant data is an ethical obligation.

== IPD meta-analysis ==
In an IPD meta-analysis, patient-level data from multiple studies or settings are combined to address a certain research question. IPD meta-analyses tend to be common for large-scale and international projects, and they are less limited than aggregate data (AD) meta-analyses in terms of the availability and quality of data they can use. Due to the high level of precision and consistency this approach allows for (which in turn makes it easier for researchers to minimize heterogeneity), it is considered the gold standard of evidence synthesis.

Common aims for an IPD meta-analysis are

- to evaluate the safety or efficacy of medical interventions
- to identify modifiers of treatment effect
- to evaluate the accuracy of diagnostic tests
- to evaluate the association of prognostic markers
- to develop multivariable prediction models (rules)
- to evaluate the predictive performance of prognostic models

Over the past few decades, meta-analyses conducted with IPD (also known as IPD meta-analyses) have become increasingly popular.
