= Individual development plan =

An individual development plan, or IDP, is a document completed by an employee, or a student, to encourage their self-development over a fixed period, often one year.

Using IDPs can provide an organisation with detailed information on the competencies and needs of their employees and guide the creation of targeted training and development programmes. A 2018 study of postdoctoral students found that 38% of those who used IDPs, found the process useful for their career development.

== See also ==
- Performance appraisal
