= Pearl growing =

Type of search strategy

Pearl growing is a metaphor taken from the process of small bits of sand growing to make a beautiful pearl, which is used in information literacy. This is also called "snowballing", alluding to the process of how a snowball can grow into a big snow-man by accumulating snow. In this context this refers to the process of using one information item (like a subject term or citation) to find content that provides more information items. This search strategy is most successfully employed at the beginning of the research process as the searcher uncovers new pearls about his or her topic.

== Citation pearl growing ==
Citation pearl growing is the act of using one relevant source, or citation, to find more relevant sources on a topic. The searcher usually has a document that matches a topic or information need. From this document, the searcher is able to find other keywords, descriptors and themes to use in a subsequent search. Citation Pearl Growing is a popular search and retrieval method used by librarians.

== Subject pearl growing ==
Subject pearl growing is a strategy used in an electronic database that has subject or keyword descriptors. By clicking on one subject, the searcher is able to find other related subjects and subdivisions that may or may not be useful to the search.

== Internet pearl growing ==
Searchers use the pearl growing technique when surfing the Internet. Using the theory that websites that link to each other are similar, a searcher can move from site to site, collecting information. Ramer (2005) suggests pearl growing by using the pearl as a search term in search engines or even in the URL.

== Systematic literature review pearl growing ==
In systematic literature reviews, pearl growing is a technique used to ensure all relevant articles are included. Pearl growing involves identifying a primary article that meets the inclusion criteria for the review. From this primary article, the researcher works backwards to find all the articles cited in the bibliography and checks them for eligibility for inclusion in the review. The researcher then works forwards to search for any articles that have cited the primary article. It is estimated that up to 51% of references in a systematic review are identified by pearl growing. There is evidence that using pearl growing for systematic reviews is a more comprehensive approach and more likely to identify all relevant articles compared to online database searches.

Pearl growing, when applied to scientific literature, may also be referred to as citation mining or snowballing.
