= Meta-analysis =

Statistical method that summarizes and/or integrates data from multiple sources

Meta-analysis is a method of synthesis of quantitative data from multiple independent studies addressing a common research question. An important part of this method involves computing a combined effect size across all of the studies. As such, this statistical approach involves extracting effect sizes and variance measures from various studies. By combining these effect sizes the statistical power is improved and can resolve uncertainties or discrepancies found in individual studies. Meta-analyses are integral in supporting research grant proposals, shaping treatment guidelines, and influencing health policies. They are also pivotal in summarizing existing research to guide future studies, thereby cementing their role as a fundamental methodology in metascience. Meta-analyses are often, but not always, important components of a systematic review.

== History ==
The term "meta-analysis" was coined in 1976 by the statistician Gene V. Glass, who, in an article in Educational Researcher that year, stated: "meta-analysis refers to the analysis of analyses". Glass's work aimed at describing aggregated measures of relationships and effects. While Glass is credited with authoring the first modern meta-analysis, a 1904 paper by the statistician Karl Pearson published in the British Medical Journal collated data from several studies of typhoid inoculation; it is seen as the first time a meta-analytic approach was used to aggregate the outcomes of multiple clinical studies. Numerous other examples of early meta-analyses can be found, including in occupational aptitude testing and agriculture.

The first model meta-analysis was published in 1978 on the effectiveness of psychotherapy by Mary Lee Smith and Glass. After publication of their article, there was pushback on the usefulness and validity of meta-analysis as a tool for evidence synthesis. The first example of this was by Hans Eysenck, who, in a 1978 article in response to the work done by Smith and Glass, called meta-analysis an "exercise in mega-silliness". Later, Eysenck would refer to meta-analysis as "statistical alchemy". Despite these criticisms, the use of meta-analysis has only grown since its introduction. By 1991 there were 334 published meta-analyses and this had grown to 9,135 by 2014.

The field of meta-analysis expanded greatly after the 1970s and touches multiple disciplines; including psychology, medicine, and ecology. Further, the more recent creation of evidence synthesis communities has increased cross-pollination of ideas and methods and the creation of software tools across disciplines.

== Literature search ==
One of the most important steps in a meta-analysis is data collection. For an efficient database search, appropriate keywords and search limits need to be identified. The use of Boolean operators and search limits can assist the literature search. A number of databases are available (e.g., PubMed, Embase, PsycINFO), but it is up to the researcher to choose the most appropriate sources for their research area. Indeed, many scientists use duplicate search terms within two or more databases to cover multiple sources. The reference lists of eligible studies can also be searched for eligible studies (i.e., snowballing). The initial search may return a large volume of studies. Quite often, the abstract or the title of the manuscript reveals that the study is not eligible for inclusion, based on the pre-specified criteria. These studies can be discarded. However, if the study appears eligible (or even if there is some doubt), the full paper can be retained for closer inspection. The reference lists of eligible articles can also be searched for any relevant articles. These search results need to be detailed in a PRIMSA flow diagram, which details the flow of information through all stages of the review. Thus, it is important how many studies were returned after using the specified search terms, how many were discarded, and why. The search terms and strategy should be specific enough for a reader to reproduce the search. The date range of studies, along with the date (or date period) the search was conducted, should also be provided.

A data-collection form provides a standardized means of collecting data from eligible studies. For a meta-analysis of correlational data, effect size information is usually collected as Pearson correlation coefficient (r). Partial correlations are often reported in research; however, these may inflate relationships in comparison to zero-order correlations. A 2024 simulation study found that standard meta-analysis methods are biased away from zero when applied to partial correlations, and proposed a correction that adjust the degrees of freedom used to compute the correlations. Moreover, the partialed-out variables will likely vary from study to study. As a consequence, many meta-analyses exclude partial correlations from their analysis. As a final resort, plot digitizers can be used to scrape data points from scatterplots (if available) for the calculation of Pearson's r. Data on important study characteristics that may moderate observed effects, such as the mean age of participants, should also be collected. A measure of study quality can also be included in these forms to assess the quality of evidence from each study. There are more than 80 tools available to assess the quality and risk of bias in observational studies, reflecting the diversity of research approaches between fields. These tools usually include an assessment of how dependent variables were measured, appropriate selection of participants, and appropriate control for confounding factors. Other quality measures that may be more relevant to correlational studies include sample size, psychometric properties, and method reporting.

A final consideration is whether to include studies from the grey literature, which is defined as research that has not been formally published. This type of literature includes conference abstracts, dissertations, and pre-prints. While the inclusion of grey literature reduces the risk of publication bias, the methodological quality of the work is often (but not always) lower than formally published work. Reports from conference proceedings, which are the most common source of grey literature, are poorly reported, and data in the subsequent publication are often inconsistent, with differences observed in almost 20% of published studies.

== Methods and assumptions ==
=== Approaches ===
In general, two types of evidence can be distinguished when performing a meta-analysis: individual participant data (IPD), and aggregate data (AD). The aggregate data can be direct or indirect.

AD is more commonly available (e.g. from the literature) and typically represents summary estimates such as odds ratios or relative risks. This can be directly synthesized across conceptually similar studies using several approaches. On the other hand, indirect aggregate data measures the effect of two treatments that were each compared against a similar control group in a meta-analysis. For example, if treatment A and treatment B were directly compared vs placebo in separate meta-analyses, we can use these two pooled results to get an estimate of the effects of A vs B in an indirect comparison as effect A vs Placebo minus effect B vs Placebo.

IPD evidence represents raw data as collected by the study centers. This distinction has raised the need for different meta-analytic methods when evidence synthesis is desired, and has led to the development of one-stage and two-stage methods. In one-stage methods the IPD from all studies are modeled simultaneously whilst accounting for the clustering of participants within studies. Two-stage methods first compute summary statistics for AD from each study and then calculate overall statistics as a weighted average of the study statistics. By reducing IPD to AD, two-stage methods can also be applied when IPD is available; this makes them an appealing choice when performing a meta-analysis. Although it is conventionally believed that one-stage and two-stage methods yield similar results, recent studies have shown that they may occasionally lead to different conclusions.

=== Statistical models for aggregate data ===
==== Fixed effect model ====
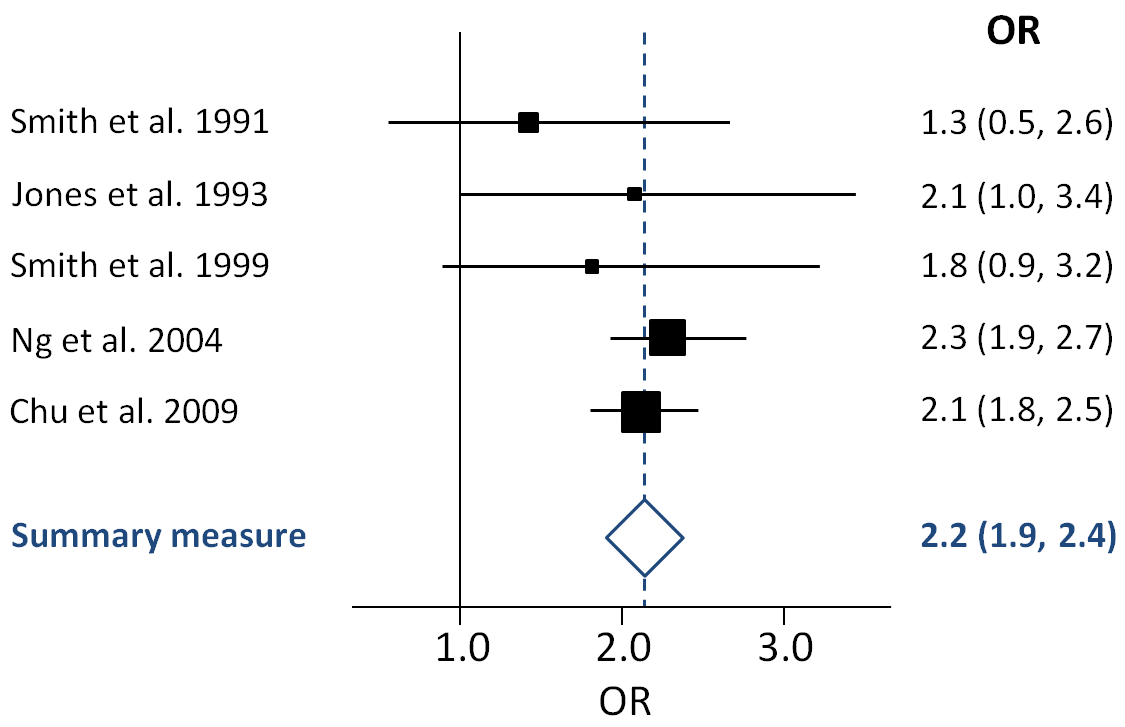
Forest Plot of Effect Sizes

The fixed effect model provides a weighted average of a series of study estimates. The inverse of the estimates' variance is commonly used as study weight, so that larger studies tend to contribute more than smaller studies to the weighted average. Consequently, when studies within a meta-analysis are dominated by a very large study, the findings from smaller studies are practically ignored. Most importantly, the fixed effects model assumes that all included studies investigate the same population, use the same variable and outcome definitions, etc. This assumption is typically unrealistic as research is often prone to several sources of heterogeneity.

If we start with a collection of independent effect size estimates, each estimate a corresponding effect size $i = 1,\ldots,k$ we can assume that $y_i = \theta_i + e_i$ where $y_i$ denotes the observed effect in the $i$-th study, $\theta_i$ the corresponding (unknown) true effect, $e_i$ is the sampling error, and $e_i \thicksim N(0, v_i)$. Therefore, the $y_i$'s are assumed to be unbiased and normally distributed estimates of their corresponding true effects. The sampling variances (i.e., $v_i$ values) are assumed to be known.

==== Random effects model ====
Most meta-analyses are based on sets of studies that are not exactly identical in their methods and/or the characteristics of the included samples. Differences in the methods and sample characteristics may introduce variability ("heterogeneity") among the true effects. One way to model the heterogeneity is to treat it as purely random. The weight that is applied in this process of weighted averaging with a random effects meta-analysis is achieved in two steps:

1. Step 1: Inverse variance weighting
2. Step 2: Un-weighting of this inverse variance weighting by applying a random effects variance component (REVC) that is simply derived from the extent of variability of the effect sizes of the underlying studies.

This means that the greater this variability in effect sizes (otherwise known as heterogeneity), the greater the un-weighting and this can reach a point when the random effects meta-analysis result becomes simply the un-weighted average effect size across the studies. At the other extreme, when all effect sizes are similar (or variability does not exceed sampling error), no REVC is applied and the random effects meta-analysis defaults to simply a fixed effect meta-analysis (only inverse variance weighting).

The extent of this reversal is solely dependent on two factors:

1. Heterogeneity of precision
2. Heterogeneity of effect size

Since neither of these factors automatically indicates a faulty larger study or more reliable smaller studies, the re-distribution of weights under this model will not bear a relationship to what these studies actually might offer. Indeed, it has been demonstrated that redistribution of weights is simply in one direction from larger to smaller studies as heterogeneity increases until eventually all studies have equal weight and no more redistribution is possible. Another issue with the random effects model is that the most commonly used confidence intervals generally do not retain their coverage probability above the specified nominal level and thus substantially underestimate the statistical error and are potentially overconfident in their conclusions. Several fixes have been suggested but the debate continues on. A further concern is that the average treatment effect can sometimes be even less conservative compared to the fixed effect model and therefore misleading in practice. One interpretational fix that has been suggested is to create a prediction interval around the random effects estimate to portray the range of possible effects in practice. However, an assumption behind the calculation of such a prediction interval is that trials are considered more or less homogeneous entities and that included patient populations and comparator treatments should be considered exchangeable and this is usually unattainable in practice.

There are many methods used to estimate between studies variance with restricted maximum likelihood estimator being the least prone to bias and one of the most commonly used. Several advanced iterative techniques for computing the between studies variance exist including both maximum likelihood and restricted maximum likelihood methods and random effects models using these methods can be run with multiple software platforms including Excel, Stata, SPSS, and R.

Most meta-analyses include between 2 and 4 studies and such a sample is more often than not inadequate to accurately estimate heterogeneity. Thus it appears that in small meta-analyses, an incorrect zero between study variance estimate is obtained, leading to a false homogeneity assumption. Overall, it appears that heterogeneity is being consistently underestimated in meta-analyses and sensitivity analyses in which high heterogeneity levels are assumed could be informative. These random effects models and software packages mentioned above relate to study-aggregate meta-analyses and researchers wishing to conduct individual patient data (IPD) meta-analyses need to consider mixed-effects modelling approaches.

==== Quality effects model ====
Doi and Thalib originally introduced the quality effects model. They introduced a new approach to adjustment for inter-study variability by incorporating the contribution of variance due to a relevant component (quality) in addition to the contribution of variance due to random error that is used in any fixed effects meta-analysis model to generate weights for each study. The strength of the quality effects meta-analysis is that it allows available methodological evidence to be used over subjective random effects, and thereby helps to close the damaging gap which has opened up between methodology and statistics in clinical research. To do this a synthetic bias variance is computed based on quality information to adjust inverse variance weights and the quality adjusted weight of the ith study is introduced. These adjusted weights are then used in meta-analysis. In other words, if study i is of good quality and other studies are of poor quality, a proportion of their quality adjusted weights is mathematically redistributed to study i giving it more weight towards the overall effect size. As studies become increasingly similar in terms of quality, re-distribution becomes progressively less and ceases when all studies are of equal quality (in the case of equal quality, the quality effects model defaults to the IVhet model – see previous section). A recent evaluation of the quality effects model (with some updates) demonstrates that despite the subjectivity of quality assessment, the performance (MSE and true variance under simulation) is superior to that achievable with the random effects model. This model thus replaces the untenable interpretations that abound in the literature and a software is available to explore this method further.

==== Network meta-analysis methods ====
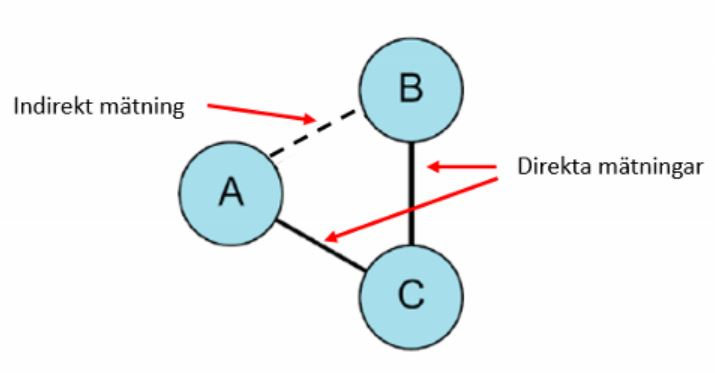
A network meta-analysis looks at indirect comparisons. In the image, A has been analyzed in relation to C and C has been analyzed in relation to B. However the relation between A and B is only known indirectly, and a network meta-analysis looks at such indirect evidence of differences between methods and interventions using statistical method.

Indirect comparison meta-analysis methods (also called network meta-analyses, in particular when multiple treatments are assessed simultaneously) generally use two main methodologies. First is the Bucher method, which is a single or repeated comparison of a closed loop of three-treatments such that one of them is common to the two studies and forms the node where the loop begins and ends. Therefore, multiple two-by-two comparisons (3-treatment loops) are needed to compare multiple treatments. This methodology requires that trials with more than two arms have two arms only selected as independent pair-wise comparisons are required. The alternative methodology uses complex statistical modelling to include the multiple arm trials and comparisons simultaneously between all competing treatments. These have been executed using Bayesian methods, mixed linear models and meta-regression approaches.

===== Bayesian framework =====
Specifying a Bayesian network meta-analysis model involves writing a directed acyclic graph (DAG) model for general-purpose Markov chain Monte Carlo (MCMC) software such as WinBUGS. In addition, prior distributions have to be specified for a number of the parameters, and the data have to be supplied in a specific format. Together, the DAG, priors, and data form a Bayesian hierarchical model. To complicate matters further, because of the nature of MCMC estimation, overdispersed starting values have to be chosen for a number of independent chains so that convergence can be assessed. Recently, multiple R software packages were developed to simplify the model fitting (e.g., metaBMA and RoBMA) and even implemented in statistical software with graphical user interface (GUI): JASP. Although the complexity of the Bayesian approach limits usage of this methodology, recent tutorial papers are trying to increase accessibility of the methods. Methodology for automation of this method has been suggested but requires that arm-level outcome data are available, and this is usually unavailable. Great claims are sometimes made for the inherent ability of the Bayesian framework to handle network meta-analysis and its greater flexibility. However, this choice of implementation of framework for inference, Bayesian or frequentist, may be less important than other choices regarding the modeling of effects (see discussion on models above).

===== Frequentist multivariate framework =====
On the other hand, the frequentist multivariate methods involve approximations and assumptions that are not stated explicitly or verified when the methods are applied (see discussion on meta-analysis models above). For example, the mvmeta package for Stata enables network meta-analysis in a frequentist framework. However, if there is no common comparator in the network, then this has to be handled by augmenting the dataset with fictional arms with high variance, which is not very objective and requires a decision as to what constitutes a sufficiently high variance. The other issue is use of the random effects model in both this frequentist framework and the Bayesian framework. Senn advises analysts to be cautious about interpreting the 'random effects' analysis since only one random effect is allowed for but one could envisage many. Senn goes on to say that it is rather naıve, even in the case where only two treatments are being compared to assume that random-effects analysis accounts for all uncertainty about the way effects can vary from trial to trial. Newer models of meta-analysis such as those discussed above would certainly help alleviate this situation and have been implemented in the next framework.

===== Generalized pairwise modelling framework =====
An approach that has been explored since the late 1990s is the implementation of multiple three-treatment closed-loop analysis. However, this approach has not gained popularity because the process quickly becomes overwhelming as the complexity of the network increases. Development in this area was subsequently abandoned in favor of Bayesian and multivariate frequentist methods, which emerged as alternative approaches. Very recently, automation of the three-treatment closed loop method has been developed for complex networks by some researchers as a way to make this methodology available to the mainstream research community. This proposal does restrict each trial to two interventions, but also introduces a workaround for multiple arm trials: a different fixed control node can be selected in different runs. It also utilizes robust meta-analysis methods so that many of the problems highlighted above are avoided. Further research around this framework is required to determine if this is indeed superior to the Bayesian or multivariate frequentist frameworks. Researchers willing to try this out have access to this framework through a free software.

==== Diagnostic test accuracy meta-analysis ====
Diagnostic test accuracy (DTA) meta-analyses differ methodologically from those assessing intervention effects, as they aim to jointly synthesize pairs of sensitivity and specificity values. These parameters are typically analyzed using hierarchical models that account for the correlation between them and between-study heterogeneity. Two commonly used models are the bivariate random-effects model and the hierarchical summary receiver operating characteristic (HSROC) model. These approaches are recommended by the Cochrane Handbook for Systematic Reviews of Diagnostic Test Accuracy and are widely used in reviews of screening tests, imaging tools, and laboratory diagnostics.

Beyond the standard hierarchical models, other approaches have been developed to address various complexities in diagnostic accuracy synthesis. These include methods that incorporate differences in threshold effects, account for covariates through meta-regression, or improve applicability by considering test setting and clinical variation. Some frameworks aim to adapt the synthesis to reflect intended use conditions more directly. These extensions are part of an evolving body of methodology that reflects growing experience in the field and increasing demands from clinical and policy decision-makers.

==== Aggregating IPD and AD ====
Meta-analysis can also be applied to combine IPD and AD. This is convenient when the researchers who conduct the analysis have their own raw data while collecting aggregate or summary data from the literature. The generalized integration model (GIM) is a generalization of the meta-analysis. It allows that the model fitted on the individual participant data (IPD) is different from the ones used to compute the aggregate data (AD). GIM can be viewed as a model calibration method for integrating information with more flexibility.

=== Validation of meta-analysis results ===
The meta-analysis estimate represents a weighted average across studies and when there is heterogeneity this may result in the summary estimate not being representative of individual studies. Qualitative appraisal of the primary studies using established tools can uncover potential biases, but does not quantify the aggregate effect of these biases on the summary estimate. Although the meta-analysis result could be compared with an independent prospective primary study, such external validation is often impractical. This has led to the development of methods that exploit a form of leave-one-out cross validation, sometimes referred to as internal-external cross validation (IOCV). Here each of the k included studies in turn is omitted and compared with the summary estimate derived from aggregating the remaining k- 1 studies. A general validation statistic, Vn based on IOCV has been developed to measure the statistical validity of meta-analysis results. For test accuracy and prediction, particularly when there are multivariate effects, other approaches which seek to estimate the prediction error have also been proposed.

== Challenges ==
A meta-analysis of several small studies does not always predict the results of a single large study. Some have argued that a weakness of the method is that sources of bias are not controlled by the method: a good meta-analysis cannot correct for poor design or bias in the original studies. This would mean that only methodologically sound studies should be included in a meta-analysis, a practice called 'best evidence synthesis'. Other meta-analysts would include weaker studies, and add a study-level predictor variable that reflects the methodological quality of the studies to examine the effect of study quality on the effect size. However, others have argued that a better approach is to preserve information about the variance in the study sample, casting as wide a net as possible, and that methodological selection criteria introduce unwanted subjectivity, defeating the purpose of the approach. More recently, and under the influence of a push for open practices in science, tools to develop "crowd-sourced" living meta-analyses that are updated by communities of scientists in hopes of making all the subjective choices more explicit.

=== Publication bias: the file drawer problem ===
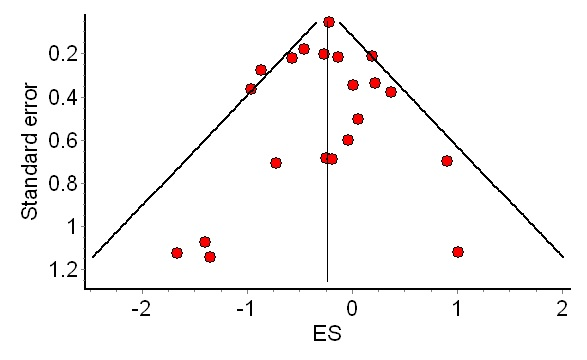
A funnel plot expected without the file drawer problem. The largest studies converge at the tip while smaller studies show more or less symmetrical scatter at the base.

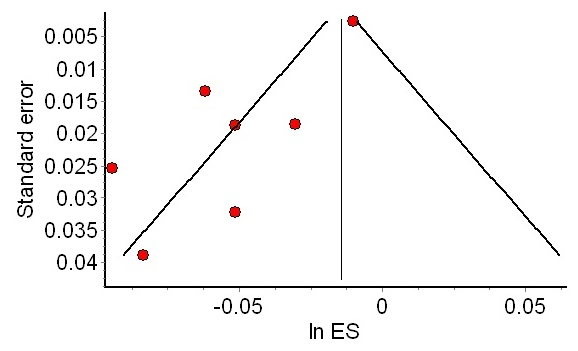
A funnel plot expected with the file drawer problem. The largest studies still cluster around the tip, but the bias against publishing negative studies has caused the smaller studies as a whole to have an unjustifiably favorable result to the hypothesis.

Another potential pitfall is the reliance on the available body of published studies, which may create exaggerated outcomes due to publication bias, as studies which show negative results or insignificant results are less likely to be published. For example, pharmaceutical companies have been known to hide negative studies and researchers may have overlooked unpublished studies such as dissertation studies or conference abstracts that did not reach publication. This is not easily solved, as one cannot know how many studies have gone unreported.

This file drawer problem characterized by negative or non-significant results being tucked away in a cabinet, can result in a biased distribution of effect sizes thus creating a serious base rate fallacy, in which the significance of the published studies is overestimated, as other studies were either not submitted for publication or were rejected. This should be seriously considered when interpreting the outcomes of a meta-analysis.

The distribution of effect sizes can be visualized with a funnel plot which (in its most common version) is a scatter plot of standard error versus the effect size. It makes use of the fact that the smaller studies (thus larger standard errors) have more scatter of the magnitude of effect (being less precise) while the larger studies have less scatter and form the tip of the funnel. If many negative studies were not published, the remaining positive studies give rise to a funnel plot in which the base is skewed to one side (asymmetry of the funnel plot). In contrast, when there is no publication bias, the effect of the smaller studies has no reason to be skewed to one side and so a symmetric funnel plot results. This also means that if no publication bias is present, there would be no relationship between standard error and effect size. A negative or positive relation between standard error and effect size would imply that smaller studies that found effects in one direction only were more likely to be published and/or to be submitted for publication.

Apart from the visual funnel plot, statistical methods for detecting publication bias have also been proposed. These are controversial because they typically have low power for detection of bias, but also may make false positives under some circumstances. For instance small study effects (biased smaller studies), wherein methodological differences between smaller and larger studies exist, may cause asymmetry in effect sizes that resembles publication bias. However, small study effects may be just as problematic for the interpretation of meta-analyses, and the imperative is on meta-analytic authors to investigate potential sources of bias.

The problem of publication bias is not trivial as it is suggested that 25% of meta-analyses in the psychological sciences may have suffered from publication bias. However, low power of existing tests and problems with the visual appearance of the funnel plot remain an issue, and estimates of publication bias may remain lower than what truly exists.

Most discussions of publication bias focus on journal practices favoring publication of statistically significant findings. However, questionable research practices, such as reworking statistical models until significance is achieved, may also favor statistically significant findings in support of researchers' hypotheses.

=== Problems related to studies not reporting non-statistically significant effects ===
Studies often do not report the effects when they do not reach statistical significance. For example, they may simply say that the groups did not show statistically significant differences, without reporting any other information (e.g. a statistic or p-value). Exclusion of these studies would lead to a situation similar to publication bias, but their inclusion (assuming null effects) would also bias the meta-analysis.

=== Problems related to the statistical approach ===
Other weaknesses are that it has not been determined if the statistically most accurate method for combining results is the fixed, IVhet, random or quality effect models, though the criticism against the random effects model is mounting because of the perception that the new random effects (used in meta-analysis) are essentially formal devices to facilitate smoothing or shrinkage and prediction may be impossible or ill-advised. The main problem with the random effects approach is that it uses the classic statistical thought of generating a "compromise estimator" that makes the weights close to the naturally weighted estimator if heterogeneity across studies is large but close to the inverse variance weighted estimator if the between study heterogeneity is small. However, what has been ignored is the distinction between the model we choose to analyze a given dataset, and the mechanism by which the data came into being. A random effect can be present in either of these roles, but the two roles are quite distinct. There's no reason to think the analysis model and data-generation mechanism (model) are similar in form, but many sub-fields of statistics have developed the habit of assuming, for theory and simulations, that the data-generation mechanism (model) is identical to the analysis model we choose (or would like others to choose). As a hypothesized mechanisms for producing the data, the random effect model for meta-analysis is silly and it is more appropriate to think of this model as a superficial description and something we choose as an analytical tool – but this choice for meta-analysis may not work because the study effects are a fixed feature of the respective meta-analysis and the probability distribution is only a descriptive tool.

=== Problems arising from agenda-driven bias ===
The most severe fault in meta-analysis often occurs when the person or persons doing the meta-analysis have an economic, social, or political agenda such as the passage or defeat of legislation. People with these types of agendas may be more likely to abuse meta-analysis due to personal bias. For example, researchers favorable to the author's agenda are likely to have their studies cherry-picked while those not favorable will be ignored or labeled as "not credible". In addition, the favored authors may themselves be biased or paid to produce results that support their overall political, social, or economic goals in ways such as selecting small favorable data sets and not incorporating larger unfavorable data sets. The influence of such biases on the results of a meta-analysis is possible because the methodology of meta-analysis is highly malleable.

A 2011 study done to disclose possible conflicts of interests in underlying research studies used for medical meta-analyses reviewed 29 meta-analyses and found that conflicts of interests in the studies underlying the meta-analyses were rarely disclosed. The 29 meta-analyses included 11 from general medicine journals, 15 from specialty medicine journals, and three from the Cochrane Database of Systematic Reviews. The 29 meta-analyses reviewed a total of 509 randomized controlled trials (RCTs). Of these, 318 RCTs reported funding sources, with 219 (69%) receiving funding from industry (i.e. one or more authors having financial ties to the pharmaceutical industry). Of the 509 RCTs, 132 reported author conflict of interest disclosures, with 91 studies (69%) disclosing one or more authors having financial ties to industry. The information was, however, seldom reflected in the meta-analyses. Only two (7%) reported RCT funding sources and none reported RCT author-industry ties. The authors concluded "without acknowledgment of COI due to industry funding or author industry financial ties from RCTs included in meta-analyses, readers' understanding and appraisal of the evidence from the meta-analysis may be compromised."

For example, in 1998, a US federal judge found that the United States Environmental Protection Agency had abused the meta-analysis process to produce a study claiming cancer risks to non-smokers from environmental tobacco smoke (ETS) with the intent to influence policy makers to pass smoke-free–workplace laws.

=== Comparability and validity of included studies ===
Meta-analysis may often not be a substitute for an adequately powered primary study, particularly in the biological sciences.

Heterogeneity of methods used may lead to faulty conclusions. For instance, differences in the forms of an intervention or the cohorts that are thought to be minor or are unknown to the scientists could lead to substantially different results, including results that distort the meta-analysis' results or are not adequately considered in its data. Vice versa, results from meta-analyses may also make certain hypothesis or interventions seem nonviable and preempt further research or approvals, despite certain modifications – such as intermittent administration, personalized criteria and combination measures – leading to substantially different results, including in cases where such have been successfully identified and applied in small-scale studies that were considered in the meta-analysis. Standardization, reproduction of experiments, open data and open protocols may often not mitigate such problems, for instance as relevant factors and criteria could be unknown or not be recorded.

There is a debate about the appropriate balance between testing with as few animals or humans as possible and the need to obtain robust, reliable findings. It has been argued that unreliable research is inefficient and wasteful and that studies are not just wasteful when they stop too late but also when they stop too early. In large clinical trials, planned, sequential analyses are sometimes used if there is considerable expense or potential harm associated with testing participants. In applied behavioural science, "megastudies" have been proposed to investigate the efficacy of many different interventions designed in an interdisciplinary manner by separate teams. One such study used a fitness chain to recruit a large number participants. It has been suggested that behavioural interventions are often hard to compare [in meta-analyses and reviews], as "different scientists test different intervention ideas in different samples using different outcomes over different time intervals", causing a lack of comparability of such individual investigations which limits "their potential to inform policy".

=== Weak inclusion standards lead to misleading conclusions ===
Meta-analyses in education are often not restrictive enough in regards to the methodological quality of the studies they include. For example, studies that include small samples or researcher-made measures lead to inflated effect size estimates. However, this problem also troubles meta-analysis of clinical trials. The use of different quality assessment tools (QATs) lead to including different studies and obtaining conflicting estimates of average treatment effects.

== Applications in modern science ==
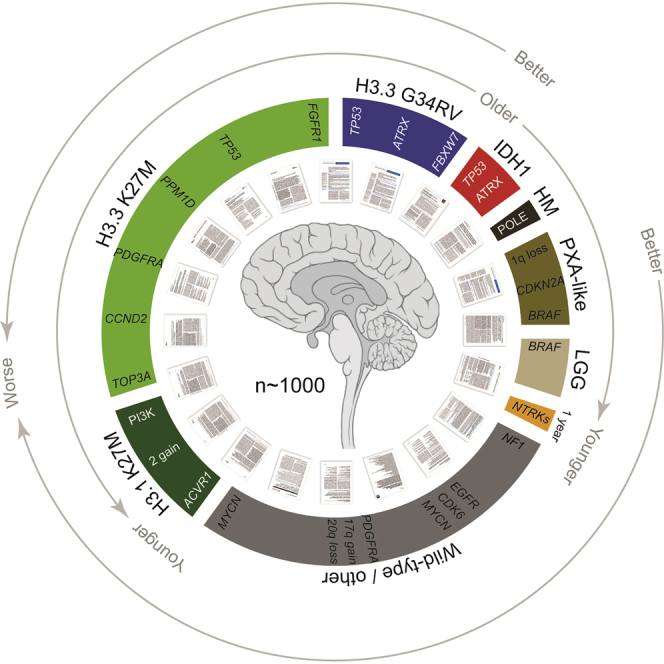
Graphical summary of a meta-analysis of over 1,000 cases of diffuse intrinsic pontine glioma and other pediatric gliomas, in which information about the mutations involved as well as generic outcomes were distilled from the underlying primary literature

Modern statistical meta-analysis does more than just combine the effect sizes of a set of studies using a weighted average. It can test if the outcomes of studies show more variation than the variation that is expected because of the sampling of different numbers of research participants. Additionally, study characteristics such as measurement instrument used, population sampled, or aspects of the studies' design can be coded and used to reduce variance of the estimator (see statistical models above). Thus some methodological weaknesses in studies can be corrected statistically. Other uses of meta-analytic methods include the development and validation of clinical prediction models, where meta-analysis may be used to combine individual participant data from different research centers and to assess the model's generalisability, or even to aggregate existing prediction models.

Meta-analysis can be done with single-subject design as well as group research designs. This is important because much research has been done with single-subject research designs. Considerable dispute exists for the most appropriate meta-analytic technique for single subject research.

Meta-analysis leads to a shift of emphasis from single studies to multiple studies. It emphasizes the practical importance of the effect size instead of the statistical significance of individual studies. This shift in thinking has been termed "meta-analytic thinking". The results of a meta-analysis are often shown in a forest plot.

Results from studies are combined using different approaches. One approach frequently used in meta-analysis in health care research is termed 'inverse variance method'. The average effect size across all studies is computed as a weighted mean, whereby the weights are equal to the inverse variance of each study's effect estimator. Larger studies and studies with less random variation are given greater weight than smaller studies. Other common approaches include the Mantel–Haenszel method and the Peto method.

Seed-based d mapping (formerly signed differential mapping, SDM) is a statistical technique for meta-analyzing studies on differences in brain activity or structure which used neuroimaging techniques such as fMRI, VBM or PET.

Different high throughput techniques such as microarrays have been used to understand Gene expression. MicroRNA expression profiles have been used to identify differentially expressed microRNAs in particular cell or tissue type or disease conditions or to check the effect of a treatment. A meta-analysis of such expression profiles was performed to derive novel conclusions and to validate the known findings.

Meta-analysis of whole genome sequencing studies provides an attractive solution to the problem of collecting large sample sizes for discovering rare variants associated with complex phenotypes. Some methods have been developed to enable functionally informed rare variant association meta-analysis in biobank-scale cohorts using efficient approaches for summary statistic storage.

Sweeping meta-analyses can also be used to estimate a network of effects. This allows researchers to examine patterns in the fuller panorama of more accurately estimated results and draw conclusions that consider the broader context (e.g., how personality-intelligence relations vary by trait family).

== Software ==
R Package: metafor & meta, RevMan, JASP, Jamovi, StatsDirect, MetaEssential, Comprehensive meta-analysis

== See also ==
- Estimation statistics
- Metascience
- Metasynthesis
- Newcastle–Ottawa scale
- Reporting bias
- Review journal
- Secondary research
- Study heterogeneity
- Systematic review
- Galbraith plot
- Data aggregation

== Sources ==
This article incorporates text by Daniel S. Quintana available under the CC BY 4.0 license.

This article incorporates text by Wolfgang Viechtbauer available under the CC BY 3.0 license.
