= List of graphical methods =

This is a list of graphical methods with a mathematical basis. Included are diagram techniques, chart techniques, plot techniques, and other forms of visualization.

There is also a list of computer graphics and descriptive geometry topics.

== Simple displays ==
- Area chart
- Bar chart
  - Histogram
  - Variable-width bar chart
- Box plot
  - Dispersion fan diagram
- Graph of a function
  - Logarithmic graph paper
- Heatmap
- Line chart
- Pie chart
  - Variable-radius pie chart
- Plotting
- Radar chart
- Scatterplot
- Sparkline
- Spiral graphic
- Stemplot
- Stripe graphic
- Tape diagram

== Set theory ==
- Venn diagram
- Karnaugh diagram

== Descriptive geometry ==
- Isometric projection
- Orthographic projection
- Perspective (graphical)

== Engineering drawing ==
- Technical drawing
  - Graphical projection
- Mohr's circle
- Pantograph
- Circuit diagram
- Smith chart
- Sankey diagram

== Systems analysis ==
- Binary decision diagram
- Control-flow graph
- Functional flow block diagram
- Information flow diagram
- IDEF
- N2 chart
- Sankey diagram
- State diagram
- System context diagram
- Data-flow diagram

== Cartography ==
- Map projection
- Orthographic projection (cartography)
- Robinson projection
- Stereographic projection
- Dymaxion map
- Topographic map
- Craig retroazimuthal projection
- Hammer retroazimuthal projection

== Biological sciences ==
- Cladogram
- Punnett square
- Systems Biology Graphical Notation

== Physical sciences ==
- Free body diagram
- Greninger chart
- Phase diagram
- Wavenumber-frequency diagram
- Bode plot
- Nyquist plot
- Dalitz plot
- Feynman diagram
- Carnot Plot

== Business methods ==
- Flowchart
  - Workflow
- Gantt chart
- Growth-share matrix (often called BCG chart)
- Work breakdown structure
- Control chart
- Ishikawa diagram
- Pareto chart (often used to prioritise outputs of an Ishikawa diagram)

== Conceptual analysis ==
- Mind mapping
- Concept mapping
- Conceptual graph
- Entity-relationship diagram
- Tag cloud, also known as word cloud

== Statistics ==
- Autocorrelation plot
- Bar chart
- Biplot
- Box plot
- Bullet graph
- Chernoff faces
- Control chart
- Fan chart
- Forest plot
- Funnel plot
- Galbraith plot
- Histogram
- Mosaic plot
- Multidimensional scaling
- np-chart
- p-chart
- Pie chart
- Probability plot
  - Normal probability plot
- Poincaré plot
  - Probability plot correlation coefficient plot
- Q–Q plot
- Rankit
- Run chart
- Seasonal subseries plot
- Scatter plot
- Skewplot
- Ternary plot
- Recurrence plot
- Waterfall chart
- Violin plot

== Other ==
- Ulam spiral
- Nomogram
- Fitness landscape
- Weather map
- Predominance diagram
- One-line diagram
- Autostereogram
- Edgeworth box
- Lineweaver-Burk diagram
- Eadie-Hofstee diagram
- Population pyramid
- Parametric plot
- Causality loop diagram
- Ramachandran plot
- V model
- Sentence diagram
- Tree structure
- Treemapping
- Airfield traffic pattern diagram

== See also ==
- List of information graphics software
- Data and information visualization
