= Normal score =

Concepts in statistics

The term normal score is used with two different meanings in statistics. One of them relates to creating a single value which can be treated as if it had arisen from a standard normal distribution (zero mean, unit variance). The second one relates to assigning alternative values to data points within a dataset, with the broad intention of creating data values than can be interpreted as being approximations for values that might have been observed had the data arisen from a standard normal distribution.

The first meaning is as an alternative name for the standard score or z score, where values are standardised by subtracting the sample or estimated mean and dividing by the sample or other estimate of the standard deviation. Particularly in applications where the name "normal score" is used, there is usually a presumption that the value can be referred to a table of standard normal probabilities as a means of providing a significance test of some hypothesis, such as a difference in means.

The second meaning of normal score is associated with data values derived from the ranks of the observations within the dataset. A given data point is assigned a value which is either exactly, or an approximation to, the expectation of the order statistic of the same rank in a sample of standard normal random variables of the same size as the observed data set. Thus the meaning of a normal score of this type is essentially the same as a rankit, although the term "rankit" is becoming obsolete. In this case the transformation creates a set of values which is matched in a certain way to what would be expected had the original set of data values arisen from a normal distribution.

== See also ==
- Normalization (statistics)
- Normal probability plot
- Q–Q plot
