= Fan chart =

Fan chart may refer to:

- Fan chart (genealogy), a way of depicting a family tree
- Fan chart (time series), a way of depicting a past and future time series
- Fan chart (statistics), a way of depicting dispersions according to two categorising dimensions
