= Chester Bliss =

Chester Bliss may refer to:

- Chester Bliss Bowles (1901–1986), American diplomat and politician from Connecticut
- Chester Ittner Bliss (1899–1979), American biologist and statistician
