= Tape diagram =

Form of mathematical model

A tape diagram is a rectangular visual model resembling a piece of tape, that is used to assist with the calculation of ratios and addition, subtraction, and commonly multiplication. It is also known as a divided bar model, fraction strip, length model or strip diagram. In mathematics education, it is used to solve word problems for children in elementary school.

== Example ==
If, for example, a boy has won fifteen games, and the ratio of his wins to losses is 3:2, a tape diagram can be used to determine his number of losses, such as by doing

15	?
Total games lost = ?

3	2
Total games lost = ?

Since the ratio between his wins and losses is 3:2, and he has won fifteen games, it can be concluded that the boy has lost ten of these games.

== See also ==
- Use of bar modeling in the PR1ME Mathematics Teaching Programme
- Use of bar modeling in Singapore math
