= Fourth grade =

Educational year group

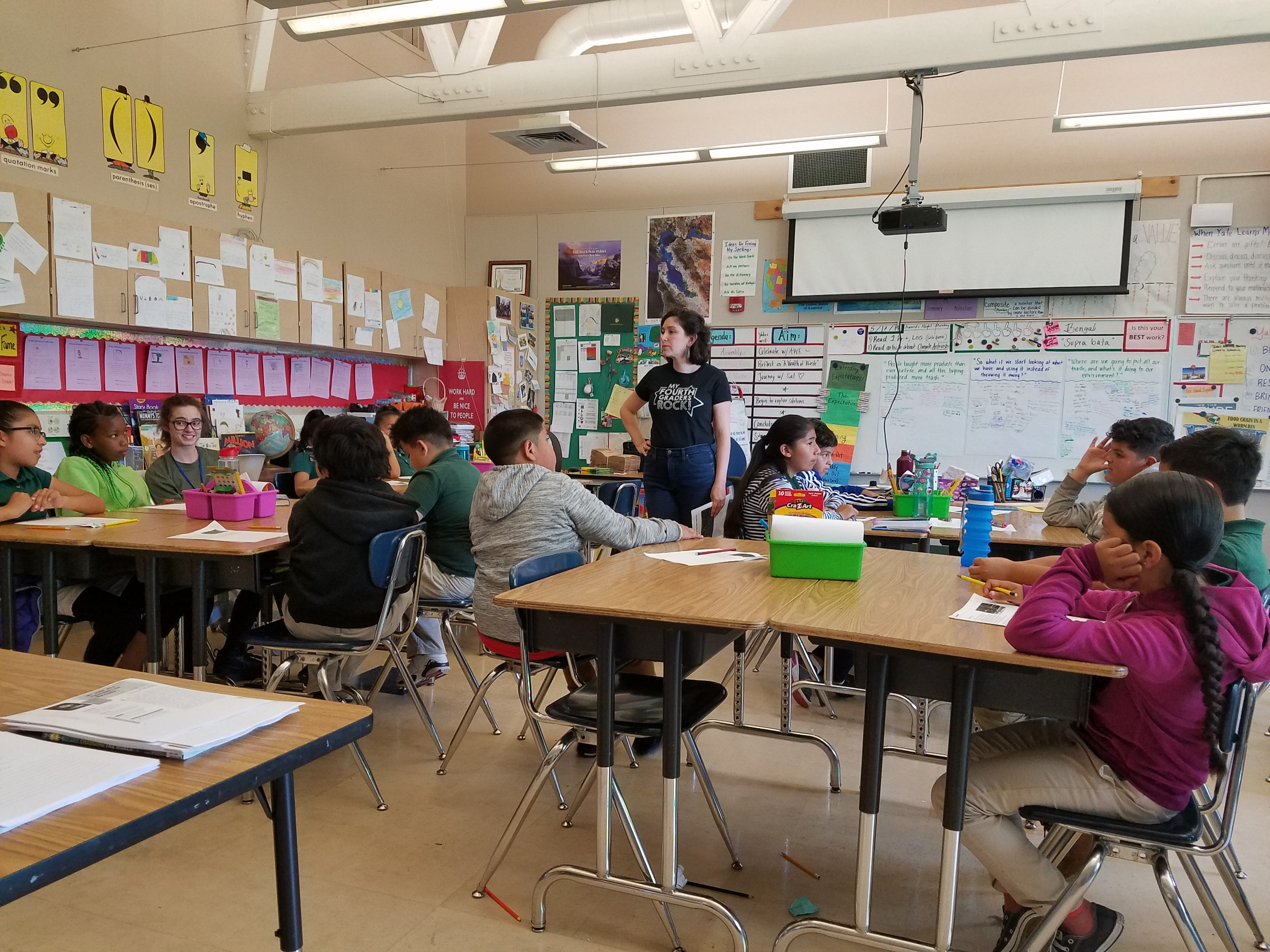
4th grade class at Acorn Woodland Elementary in Oakland, CA, USA

Fourth grade (also 4th grade or Grade 4) is the fourth year of formal or compulsory education. It is the fourth year of primary school. Children in fourth grade are usually 9–10 years old.

== Argentina ==
In Argentina, the minimum age required for the fourth grade is between 9 and 10 years old. In this situation, the children who are in the middle of primary school perform the "confirmation of loyalty to the homeland". This is an act in which a child will have to take an oath to defend Argentina for the rest of his or her life. Sometimes children take a trip to Rosario, where they raise the National Flag Memorial.

== Australia ==
In Australia, this level of class is called Year 4. Children generally start this level between the ages of nine and ten.

== Brazil ==
In Brazil, fourth grade is the quarto ano do Ensino Fundamental I. To enter the fourth grade, all children's students must be nine years old before the cut-off date. The minimum age to enter the fourth grade is nine years old.

== Canada ==
In Canada, the fourth year of elementary education is referred to as Grade 4.

== China ==
In China, the fourth year of elementary education is referred to as Grade 4. Children are usually 9 or 10 years old at the fourth grade in elementary school.

== Netherlands ==
In the Netherlands, the fourth year of school is called group 6, and the pupils are 9 to 10 years old. Children start school at age four and end school at ages 12 or 13. In Belgium, it is called 4th (study) year. The children are also between the ages of 9 and 10.

== France ==
In France, the equivalent to the above-grade is the Level 1 Intermediate Course, known by its short-form CM1 (cours moyen 1re année).

== Germany ==
In Germany, the equivalent grade is 4. Klasse. In most German states this is the year where parents have to decide what kind of school their children should master: The "Mittelschule" that usually ends with 9th grade, the "Realschule" that ends with 10th grade and allows pupils to get a better starting point for their choice of working place or the "Gymnasium" that ends either with 12th grade or 13th grade (depending on the state) and is the only direct way to go to university.

== Greece ==
In Greece, the fourth school year of primary education school is referred to as the Fourth Grade of Primary (Tetarti - Τετάρτη Δημοτικού).

== India ==
In India, where children enter Class 4 at the ages 9 to 10 it is called Lower Primary, it is known as the fourth grade. 5-7 standard categories as Upper Primary (UP). Lower Primary gives the basic education necessary for a kid and when they get to the UP section, advanced knowledge will be provided via lessons or modules.

== Ireland ==
In the Republic of Ireland, the equivalent is Fourth Class or Rang a Ceathair (for 9- to 10-year-olds), which is year 6 of Primary School.

== Kazakhstan ==
In Kazakhstan, Class 4 (4-сынып) is the final year of primary school. Children typically enter at 9–10 years old, completing the primary education phase.

== New Zealand ==
In New Zealand, this level of class is called Standard 3 or Year 4. Children generally start at this level between the ages of eight and nine.

== Philippines ==
In the Philippines, this level is called Grade 4. Mostly, students can start at age eight.

== Portugal ==
In Portugal, what North Americans would call the fourth grade (quarto ano, 4º ano to Portuguese people) is the fourth and last year of the four-year 1º Ciclo do Ensino Básico which also includes the first grade, the second grade, and the third grade. Students take final exams (provas finais) for Portuguese and Mathematics at the end of the fourth grade since the school year of 2012/2013.

== United Kingdom ==
In England, compulsory education begins with the first new term of the Reception year following a child's 5th birthday. Many children enter Reception at the beginning of the school year, aged 4. Fourth grade is the equivalent of 'Year 5' (ages 9–10) in England and Wales, Primary 6 in Northern Ireland and Scotland—the sixth year of compulsory education in England, Wales, Scotland and Northern Ireland.

== United States ==
In math, students learn about place value up to the millions, prime and composite numbers, multiplying 2-digit and 3-digit numbers, long division, fractions, decimals, the metric system, and geometry.

In social studies, students learn about geography skills such as map reading and longitude and latitude, state history, and early American history. Fourth grade is also the year that most U.S. students learn about their own state's history.

In science, the most common topics include the rock cycle, fossils, erosion, electricity, forces and motion, light, and heat. Other topics may be taught depending on the school districts or state's curriculum.

In English, kids learn skills of reading, writing, and vocabulary. These skills include finding a story's theme, comparing and contrasting, citing textual evidence, main idea, writing objective summaries, writing narratives, writing research reports, writing explanatory essays, writing persuasive and argumentative pieces, figurative language, prefixes, suffixes and context clues.

== Spain ==
In Spain, Primaria (6 to 12 years old) is compulsory for all children. 4th grade is called cuarto de Primaria or simply cuarto curso. Primaria starts at six years old, so students usually start 4th grade on the year of their tenth birthday.

== See also ==
- Educational stage
- Singapore math method
- Elementary schools in Japan

Preceded by Third grade	Fourth grade age 9–10	Succeeded by Fifth grade
