= Probability plot =

Probability plot, a graphical technique for comparing two data sets, may refer to:

- P–P plot, "probability–probability" or "percent–percent" plot
- Q–Q plot, "quantile–quantile" plot
- Normal probability plot, a Q–Q plot against the standard normal distribution

== See also ==
- Probability plot correlation coefficient
- Probability plot correlation coefficient plot
