= Concomitant (statistics) =

In statistics, the concept of a concomitant, also called the induced order statistic, arises when one sorts the members of a random sample according to corresponding values of another random sample.

Let (X_{i}, Y_{i}), i = 1, . . ., n be a random sample from a bivariate distribution. If the sample is ordered by the X_{i}, then the Y-variate associated with X_{r:n} will be denoted by Y_{[r:n]} and termed the concomitant of the r^{th} order statistic.

Suppose the parent bivariate distribution having the cumulative distribution function F(x,y) and its probability density function f(x,y), then the probability density function of r^{th} concomitant $Y_{[r:n]}$ for $1 \le r \le n$ is

$f_{Y_{[r:n]}}(y) = \int_{-\infty}^\infty f_{Y \mid X}(y|x) f_{X_{r:n}} (x) \, \mathrm{d} x$

If all $(X_i, Y_i)$ are assumed to be i.i.d., then for $1 \le r_1 < \cdots < r_k \le n$, the joint density for $\left(Y_{[r_1:n]}, \cdots, Y_{[r_k:n]} \right)$ is given by

$f_{Y_{[r_1:n]}, \cdots, Y_{[r_k:n]} }(y_1, \cdots, y_k) = \int_{-\infty}^\infty \int_{-\infty}^{x_k} \cdots \int_{-\infty}^{x_2} \prod^k_{ i=1 } f_{Y\mid X} (y_i|x_i) f_{X_{r_1:n}, \cdots, X_{r_k:n}}(x_1,\cdots,x_k)\mathrm{d}x_1\cdots \mathrm{d}x_k$

That is, in general, the joint concomitants of order statistics $\left(Y_{[r_1:n]}, \cdots, Y_{[r_k:n]} \right)$ is dependent, but are conditionally independent given $X_{r_1:n} = x_1, \cdots, X_{r_k:n} = x_k$ for all k where $x_1 \le \cdots \le x_k$. The conditional distribution of the joint concomitants can be derived from the above result by comparing the formula in marginal distribution and hence

$f_{Y_{[r_1:n]}, \cdots, Y_{[r_k:n]} \mid X_{r_1:n} \cdots X_{r_k:n} }(y_1, \cdots, y_k | x_1, \cdots, x_k) = \prod^k_{ i=1 } f_{Y\mid X} (y_i|x_i)$
