= Split normal distribution =

Split-normal
- Notation: $\mathcal{SN}(\mu,\,\sigma_1,\sigma_2)$
- Parameters: $\mu \in \Re$ — mode (location, real) $\sigma_1 > 0$ — left-hand-side standard deviation (scale, real) $\sigma_2 > 0$ — right-hand-side standard deviation (scale, real)
- Support: $x \in \Re$
- PDF: $A \exp \left(- \frac {(x-\mu)^2}{2 \sigma_1^2}\right) \quad \text{if } x< \mu$ $A \exp \left(- \frac {(x-\mu)^2}{2 \sigma_2^2}\right) \quad \text{otherwise,}$ $\text{where} \quad A= \sqrt{2/\pi} (\sigma_1+\sigma_2)^{-1}$
- Mean: $\mu+\sqrt{2 / \pi}(\sigma_2-\sigma_1)$
- Mode: $\mu$
- Variance: $(1-2 / \pi)(\sigma_2-\sigma_1)^2 + \sigma_1 \sigma_2$
- Skewness: $\gamma_3 = \sqrt{\frac{2}{\pi}}(\sigma_2-\sigma_1)\left[\left(\frac{4}{\pi}-1\right)(\sigma_2-\sigma_1)^2 + \sigma_1 \sigma_2\right]$

In probability theory and statistics, the split normal distribution also known as the two-piece normal distribution results from joining at the mode the corresponding halves of two normal distributions with the same mode but different variances. It is claimed by Johnson et al. that this distribution was introduced by Gibbons and Mylroie and by John. But these are two of several independent rediscoveries of the Zweiseitige Gauss'sche Gesetz introduced in the posthumously published Kollektivmasslehre (1897) of Gustav Theodor Fechner (1801-1887), see Wallis (2014). Another rediscovery has appeared more recently in a finance journal.

== Definition ==
The split normal distribution arises from merging two opposite halves of two probability density functions (PDFs) of normal distributions in their common mode.

The PDF of the split normal distribution is given by

$$f(x;\mu,\sigma_1,\sigma_2) =
\begin{cases}
A \exp \left(- \dfrac {(x-\mu)^2}{2 \sigma_1^2}\right) & \text{if } x< \mu \\[1ex]
A \exp \left(- \dfrac {(x-\mu)^2}{2 \sigma_2^2}\right) & \text{otherwise}
\end{cases}$$

where

$$\quad A= \sqrt{2/\pi} (\sigma_1+\sigma_2)^{-1}.$$

=== Discussion ===
The split normal distribution results from merging two halves of normal distributions. In a general case the 'parent' normal distributions can have different variances which implies that the joined PDF would not be continuous. To ensure that the resulting PDF integrates to 1, the normalizing constant A is used.

In a special case when $\sigma_1^2=\sigma_2^2=\sigma_{*}^2$ the split normal distribution reduces to normal distribution with variance $\sigma_{*}^2$.

When σ_{2}≠σ_{1} the constant A is different from the constant of normal distribution. However, when $\sigma_1^2=\sigma_2^2=\sigma_{*}^2$ the constants are equal.

The sign of its third central moment is determined by the difference (σ_{2}-σ_{1}). If this difference is positive, the distribution is skewed to the right and if negative, then it is skewed to the left.

Other properties of the split normal density were discussed by Johnson et al. and Julio.

== Alternative formulations ==
The formulation discussed above originates from John. The literature offers two mathematically equivalent alternative parameterizations . Britton, Fisher and Whitley offer a parameterization if terms of mode, dispersion and normed skewness, denoted with $\mathcal{SN}(\mu,\, \sigma^2,\gamma)$. The parameter μ is the mode and has equivalent to the mode in John's formulation. The parameter σ ^{2}>0 informs about the dispersion (scale) and should not be confused with variance. The third parameter, γ ∈ (-1,1), is the normalized skew.

The second alternative parameterization is used in the Bank of England's communication and is written in terms of mode, dispersion and unnormed skewness and is denoted with $\mathcal{SN}(\mu,\, \sigma^2,\xi)$. In this formulation the parameter μ is the mode and is identical as in John's and Britton, Fisher and Whitley's formulation. The parameter σ ^{2} informs about the dispersion (scale) and is the same as in the Britton, Fisher and Whitley's formulation. The parameter ξ equals the difference between the distribution's mean and mode and can be viewed as unnormed measure of skewness.

The three parameterizations are mathematically equivalent, meaning that there is a strict relationship between the parameters and that it is possible to go from one parameterization to another. The following relationships hold:

$$\begin{align}
\sigma^2 &= \sigma_1^2(1+\gamma)= \sigma_2^2(1-\gamma) \\
\gamma   &= \frac{\sigma_2^2-\sigma_1^2}{\sigma_2^2+\sigma_1^2} \\
\xi             &=\sqrt{2 / \pi}(\sigma_2-\sigma_1) \\
\gamma   &= \operatorname{sgn}(\xi) \sqrt{1-\left( \frac{\sqrt{1+2\beta}-1}{\beta} \right)^2}, \quad \text{where} \quad \beta = \frac{\pi\xi^2}{2\sigma^2}.
\end{align}$$

== Multivariate Extensions ==
The multivariate generalization of the split normal distribution was proposed by Villani and Larsson. They assume that each of the principal components has univariate split normal distribution with a different set of parameters μ, σ_{2} and σ_{1}.

== Estimation of parameters ==
John proposes to estimate the parameters using maximum likelihood method. He shows that the likelihood function can be expressed in an intensive form, in which the scale parameters σ_{1} and σ_{2} are a function of the location parameter μ. The likelihood in its intensive form is:

$$L(\mu) = -\left[\sum_{x_i: x_i<\mu}  (x_i-\mu)^2 \right]^{1/3} - \left[\sum_{x_i: x_i>\mu}  (x_i-\mu)^2 \right]^{1/3}$$

and has to be maximized numerically with respect to a single parameter μ only.

Given the maximum likelihood estimator $\hat{\mu}$ the other parameters take values:

$$\hat{\sigma}_1^2 = \frac{-L(\mu)}{N} \left[\sum_{x_i: x_i<\mu}  (x_i-\mu)^2 \right]^{2/3},$$
$$\hat{\sigma}_2^2 = \frac{-L(\mu)}{N} \left[\sum_{x_i: x_i>\mu}  (x_i-\mu)^2 \right]^{2/3},$$

where N is the number of observations.

Villani and Larsson propose to use either maximum likelihood method or bayesian estimation and provide some analytical results for either univariate and multivariate case.

== Applications ==
The split normal distribution has been used mainly in econometrics and time series. A remarkable area of application is the construction of the fan chart, a representation of the inflation forecast distribution reported by inflation targeting central banks around the globe.
