= Ridit scoring =

Statistical method

In statistics, ridit scoring is a statistical method used to analyze ordered qualitative measurements. The tools of ridit analysis were developed and first applied by Bross, who coined the term "ridit" by analogy with other statistical transformations such as probit and logit. A ridit describes how the distribution of the dependent variable in row i of a contingency table compares relative to an identified distribution (e.g., the marginal distribution of the dependent variable).

== Calculation of ridit scores ==
=== Choosing a reference data set ===
Since ridit scoring is used to compare two or more sets of ordered qualitative data, one set is designated as a reference against which other sets can be compared. In econometric studies, for example, the ridit scores measuring test survey answers of a competing or historically important product are often used as the reference data set against which test surveys of new products are compared. Absent a convenient reference data set, an accumulation of pooled data from several sets or even an artificial or hypothetical set can be used.

=== Determining the probability function ===
After a reference data set has been chosen, the reference data set must be converted to a probability function. To do this, let x_{1}, x_{2},..., x_{n} denote the ordered categories of the preference scale. For each j, x_{j} represents a choice or judgment. Then, let the probability function p be defined with respect to the reference data set as

$$p_j=Prob({x_j}).$$

=== Determining ridits ===
The ridit scores, or simply ridits, of the reference data set are then easily calculated as

$$w_j=0.5p_j+\sum_{k<j}{p_k}.$$

Each of the categories of the reference data set are then associated with a ridit score. More formally, for each $1\le j\le n$, the value w_{j} is the ridit score of the choice x_{j}.

== Interpretation and examples ==
Intuitively, ridit scores can be understood as a modified notion of percentile ranks. For any j, if x_{j} has a low (close to 0) ridit score, one can conclude that

$$\sum_{k<j}{Prob(x_k)}$$

is very small, which is to say that very few respondents have chosen a category "lower" than x_{j}.

== Applications ==
Ridit scoring has found use primarily in the health sciences (including nursing and epidemiology) and econometric preference studies.

== A mathematical approach ==
Besides having intuitive appeal, the derivation for ridit scoring can be arrived at with mathematically rigorous methods as well. Brockett and Levine presented a derivation of the above ridit score equations based on several intuitively uncontroversial mathematical postulates.

== Notes ==
R statistical computing package for Ridit Analysis: https://cran.r-project.org/package=Ridit
