= PR1ME Mathematics Teaching Programme =

Elementary mathematics teaching methods

- Created by: Scholastic Corporation
- Owner: Scholastic Corporation

Print publications
- Books: PR1ME Mathematics; Specific books include: PR1ME Mathematics Coursebook; PR1ME Mathematics Practice Book; PR1ME Mathematics Teacher's Guide

PR1ME Mathematics teaching programme (PR1ME) is created for the primary or elementary grades and was first introduced in 2014 by Scholastic. It is adopted by schools in multiple countries such as Philippines, Australia, New Zealand and Mexico. PR1ME is a programme based on the Mathematics teaching and learning practices of Singapore, Hong Kong and Republic of Korea, which have consistently performed strongly in international mathematics studies such as the Trends in International Mathematics and Science Study (TIMSS) and Organisation for Economic Co-operation and Development's Programme for International Student Assessment (PISA). This programme was developed in collaboration with the Ministry of Education (MOE), Singapore and is adapted from the Primary Mathematics Project developed by MOE.

== Aim of programme ==
The main aim of PR1ME is to nurture young learners and help them build strong mathematical foundation skills. It is based on the five practices listed in the pentagon, which is the framework for mathematics instruction developed by the MOE with problem solving at its core.

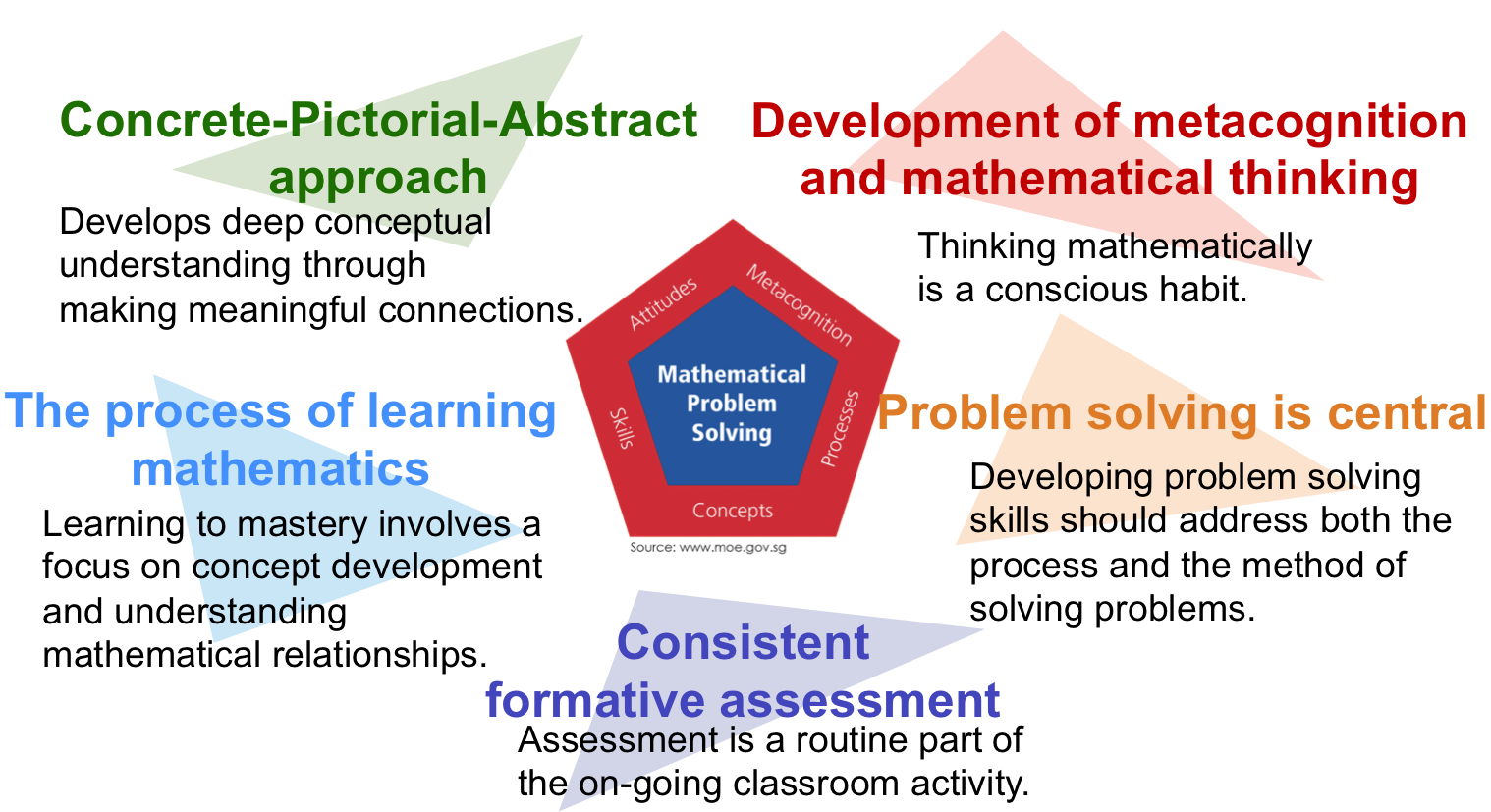
Mathematical Problem Solving Pentagon

- Problem solving is central: Developing problem solving skills should address both the process and the method of solving problems.
- Development of metacognition and mathematical thinking skills: Thinking mathematically is a conscious habit and should be developed through consistent use in many contexts.
- Concrete-Pictorial-Abstract Approach: Develops deep conceptual understanding through making meaningful connections between principles and symbols through concrete activities and visual representation, ensuring deep and long-lasting conceptual understanding.
- Process of learning mathematics: Learning to mastery involves a focus on concept development and understanding mathematical relationships, and learning to inquire, communicate, reason, conceptualize, formulate and solve mathematical problems, appreciate the beauty of mathematics and apply mathematics in different contexts.
- Consistent formative assessment: Assessment is a routine part of the on-going classroom activity.

== Approach ==
PR1ME's pedagogical approach and instructional design revolve around problem solving, and the development of metacognition and mathematical thinking skills.

Problem solving is central with an emphasis on both the process and strategies, including the Bar Model method. Process helps to build good habits for approaching mathematical problems of all levels of difficulty (UPAC – Understand, Plan, Answer, Check, Mind Stretchers) while strategies equip students to tackle different types of word problems (Heuristics, Mind Stretchers). The Bar Model method allows students to solve complex word problems using visual representation. Mathematical reasoning and problem posing allows students to be aware of their thought process, enabling them to become proficient problem solvers. Deep conceptual understanding is achieved through systematic teaching of mathematical concepts with a topic taught in-depth and over several lessons.

== See also ==
- Singapore Math
- Mathematics
