= Identity line =

Mathematical graph where x equals y

A scatter plot with the identity line as reference. In this case, the plotted points are quantiles, making it a Q–Q plot.

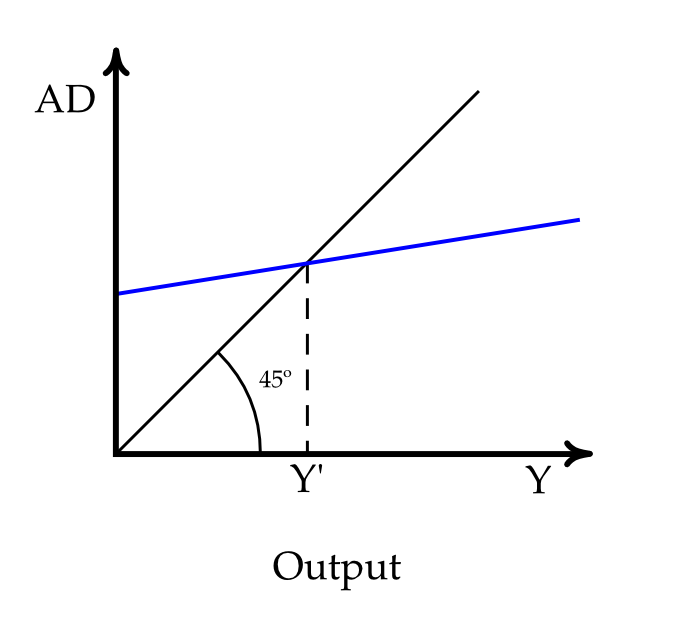
The Keynesian cross diagram includes an identity line to show states in which aggregate demand equals output

In a 2-dimensional Cartesian coordinate system, with x representing the abscissa and y the ordinate, the identity line or line of equality is the y = x line. The line, sometimes called the 1:1 line, has a slope of 1. When the abscissa and ordinate are on the same scale, the identity line forms a 45° angle with the abscissa, and is thus also, informally, called the 45° line. The line is often used as a reference in a 2-dimensional scatter plot comparing two sets of data expected to be identical under ideal conditions. When the corresponding data points from the two data sets are equal to each other, the corresponding scatters fall exactly on the identity line.

In economics, an identity line is used in the Keynesian cross diagram to identify equilibrium, as only on the identity line does aggregate demand equal aggregate supply.
