= Probability plot correlation coefficient plot =

The probability plot correlation coefficient (PPCC) plot is a graphical technique for identifying the shape parameter for a distributional family that best describes the data set. This technique is appropriate for families, such as the Weibull or the generalized Gaussian distribution, that are defined by a single shape parameter and location and scale parameters, and it is not appropriate or even possible for distributions, such as the normal, that are defined only by location and scale parameters.

Many statistical analyses are based on distributional assumptions about the population from which the data have been obtained. However, distributional families can have radically different shapes depending on the value of the shape parameter. Therefore, finding a reasonable choice for the shape parameter is a necessary step in the analysis. In many analyses, finding a good distributional model for the data is the primary focus of the analysis.

The technique is simply "plot the probability plot correlation coefficients for different values of the shape parameter, and choose whichever value yields the best fit".

== Definition ==
The PPCC plot is formed by:

- Vertical axis: Probability plot correlation coefficient;
- Horizontal axis: Value of shape parameter.

That is, for a series of values of the shape parameter, the correlation coefficient is computed for the probability plot associated with a given value of the shape parameter. These correlation coefficients are plotted against their corresponding shape parameters. The maximum correlation coefficient corresponds to the optimal value of the shape parameter. For better precision, two iterations of the PPCC plot can be generated; the first is for finding the right neighborhood and the second is for fine tuning the estimate.

The PPCC plot is used first to find a good value of the shape parameter. The probability plot is then generated to find estimates of the location and scale parameters and in addition to provide a graphical assessment of the adequacy of the distributional fit.

The PPCC plot answers the following questions:

1. What is the best-fit member within a distributional family?
2. Does the best-fit member provide a good fit (in terms of generating a probability plot with a high correlation coefficient)?
3. Does this distributional family provide a good fit compared to other distributions?
4. How sensitive is the choice of the shape parameter?

== Comparing distributions ==
In addition to finding a good choice for estimating the shape parameter of a given distribution, the PPCC plot can be useful in deciding which distributional family is most appropriate. For example, given a set of reliability data, one might generate PPCC plots for a Weibull, lognormal, gamma, and inverse Gaussian distributions, and possibly others, on a single page. This one page would show the best value for the shape parameter for several distributions and would additionally indicate which of these distributional families provides the best fit (as measured by the maximum probability plot correlation coefficient). That is, if the maximum PPCC value for the Weibull is 0.99 and only 0.94 for the lognormal, then one could reasonably conclude that the Weibull family is the better choice.

When comparing distributional models, one should not simply choose the one with the maximum PPCC value. In many cases, several distributional fits provide comparable PPCC values. For example, a lognormal and Weibull may both fit a given set of reliability data quite well. Typically, one would consider the complexity of the distribution. That is, a simpler distribution with a marginally smaller PPCC value may be preferred over a more complex distribution. Likewise, there may be theoretical justification in terms of the underlying scientific model for preferring a distribution with a marginally smaller PPCC value in some cases. In other cases, one may not need to know if the distributional model is optimal, only that it is adequate for our purposes. That is, one may be able to use techniques designed for normally distributed data even if other distributions fit the data somewhat better.

== Tukey-lambda PPCC plot for symmetric distributions ==
The Tukey lambda PPCC plot, with shape parameter λ, is particularly useful for symmetric distributions. It indicates whether a distribution is short or long tailed and it can further indicate several common distributions. Specifically,

1. λ = −1: distribution is approximately Cauchy
2. λ = 0: distribution is exactly logistic
3. λ = 0.14: distribution is approximately normal
4. λ = 0.5: distribution is U-shaped
5. λ = 1: distribution is exactly uniform(−1, 1)

If the Tukey lambda PPCC plot gives a maximum value near 0.14, one can reasonably conclude that the normal distribution is a good model for the data. If the maximum value is less than 0.14, a long-tailed distribution such as the double exponential or logistic would be a better choice. If the maximum value is near −1, this implies the selection of very long-tailed distribution, such as the Cauchy. If the maximum value is greater than 0.14, this implies a short-tailed distribution such as the Beta or uniform.

The Tukey-lambda PPCC plot is used to suggest an appropriate distribution. One should follow-up with PPCC and probability plots of the appropriate alternatives.

== See also ==
- Probability plot
