= Probit =

Statistical function that converts a probability to a standard normal score

Plot of probit function

In statistics, the probit function converts a probability (a number between 0 and 1) into a score. This score indicates how many standard deviations a value from a standard normal distribution (or "bell curve") is from the mean. For example, a probability of 0.5 (50%) represents the exact middle of the distribution, so its probit score is 0. A smaller probability like 0.025 (2.5%) is far to the left on the curve, corresponding to a probit score of approximately −1.96.

The function is widely used in probit models, a type of regression analysis for binary outcomes (e.g., success/failure or pass/fail). It was first developed in toxicology to analyze dose-response relationships, such as how the percentage of pests killed by a pesticide changes with its concentration. The probit function is also used to create Q–Q plots, a graphical tool for assessing whether a dataset is normally distributed.

Mathematically, the probit function is the quantile function (the inverse of the cumulative distribution function (CDF)) associated with the standard normal distribution. If the CDF is denoted by $\Phi(z)$, then the probit function is defined as:
$$\operatorname{probit}(p) = \Phi^{-1}(p) \quad \text{for} \quad p \in (0,1).$$
This means that for any probability $p$, the probit function finds the value $z$ such that the area under the standard normal curve to the left of $z$ is equal to $p$.

== Conceptual development ==
The idea of the probit function was published by Chester Ittner Bliss in a 1934 article in Science on how to treat data such as the percentage of a pest killed by a pesticide. Bliss proposed transforming the percentage killed into a "probability unit" (or "probit") which was linearly related to the modern definition (he defined it arbitrarily as equal to 0 for 0.0001 and 1 for 0.9999): He included a table to aid other researchers to convert their kill percentages to his probit, which they could then plot against the logarithm of the dose and thereby, it was hoped, obtain a more or less straight line. Such a so-called probit model is still important in toxicology, as well as other fields. The approach is justified in particular if response variation can be rationalized as a lognormal distribution of tolerances among subjects on test, where the tolerance of a particular subject is the dose just sufficient for the response of interest.

The method introduced by Bliss was carried forward in Probit Analysis, an important text on toxicological applications by D. J. Finney. Values tabled by Finney can be derived from probits as defined here by adding a value of 5. This distinction is summarized by Collett Probit methodology, including numerical optimization for fitting of probit functions, was introduced before widespread availability of electronic computing. When using tables, it was convenient to have probits uniformly positive. Common areas of application do not require positive probits.

== Symmetries ==
Largely because of the central limit theorem, the standard normal distribution plays a fundamental role in probability theory and statistics. If we consider the familiar fact that the standard normal distribution places 95% of probability between −1.96 and 1.96 and is symmetric around zero, it follows that
$$\Phi(-1.96) = 0.025 = 1-\Phi(1.96).$$

The probit function gives the 'inverse' computation, generating a value of a standard normal random variable, associated with specified cumulative probability. Continuing the example,
$$\operatorname{probit}(0.025) = -1.96 = -\operatorname{probit}(0.975).$$

In general,
$$\Phi(\operatorname{probit}(p))=p,$$
and
$$\operatorname{probit}(\Phi(z))=z.$$

== Diagnosing deviation of a distribution from normality ==
In addition to providing a basis for important types of regression, the probit function is useful in statistical analysis for diagnosing deviation from normality, according to the method of Q–Q plotting. If a set of data is actually a sample of a normal distribution, a plot of the values against their probit scores will be approximately linear. Specific deviations from normality such as asymmetry, heavy tails, or bimodality can be diagnosed based on detection of specific deviations from linearity. While the Q–Q plot can be used for comparison to any distribution family (not only the normal), the normal Q–Q plot is a relatively standard exploratory data analysis procedure because the assumption of normality is often a starting point for analysis.

== Computation ==
The normal distribution CDF and its inverse are not available in closed form, and computation requires careful use of numerical procedures. However, the functions are widely available in software for statistics and probability modeling, and in spreadsheets. In computing environments where numerical implementations of the inverse error function are available, the probit function may be obtained as
$$\operatorname{probit}(p) = \sqrt{2}\,\operatorname{erf}^{-1}(2p-1).$$
An example is MATLAB, where an erfinv function is available. The language Mathematica implements InverseErf. Other environments directly implement the probit function as is shown in the following R code.

> qnorm(0.025)
[1] -1.959964
> pnorm(-1.96)
[1] 0.02499790

Wichura gives a fast algorithm for computing the probit function to 16 decimal places; this is used in R to generate random variates for the normal distribution.

=== An ordinary differential equation for the probit function ===
Another means of computation is based on forming a non-linear ordinary differential equation (ODE) for probit, as per the Steinbrecher and Shaw method. Abbreviating the probit function as $w(p)$, the ODE is $\frac{d w}{d p} = \frac{1}{f(w)}$ where $f(w)$ is the probability density function of w.

In the case of the Gaussian:
$$\frac{d w}{d p} = \sqrt{2 \pi }  \ e^{\frac{w^2}{2}}.$$
Differentiating again:
$$\frac{d^2 w}{d p^2} = w \left(\frac{d w}{d p}\right)^2,$$
with the centre (initial) conditions
$$\begin{align}
w\left(1/2\right) &= 0, \\
w'\left(1/2\right) &= \sqrt{2\pi}.
\end{align}$$

This equation may be solved by several methods, including the classical power series approach. From this, solutions of arbitrarily high accuracy may be developed based on Steinbrecher's approach to the series for the inverse error function. The power series solution is given by
$$w(p) = \sqrt \frac{\pi}{2} \sum_{k=0}^{\infty} \frac{d_k}{(2k+1)}(2p-1)^{(2k+1)},$$
where the coefficients $d_k$ satisfy the non-linear recurrence
$$d_{k+1} = \frac{\pi}{4} \sum_{j=0}^k \frac{d_j d_{k-j}}{(j+1)(2j+1)}$$
with $d_0 = 1$. In this form the ratio $d_{k+1}/d_k$ approaches $1$ as $k$ approaches infinity.

== Logit ==
Comparison of the logit function with a scaled probit (i.e. the inverse CDF of the normal distribution), comparing logit(x) vs. Φ^{−1}(x) / √π/8, which makes the slopes the same at the origin.

Closely related to the probit function (and probit model) are the logit function and logit model. The inverse of the logistic function is given by
$$\operatorname{logit}(p)=\ln\left( \frac{p}{1-p} \right).$$

Analogously to the probit model, we may assume that such a quantity is related linearly to a set of predictors, resulting in the logit model, the basis in particular of logistic regression model, the most prevalent form of regression analysis for categorical response data. In current statistical practice, probit and logit regression models are often handled as cases of the generalized linear model.

== See also ==
- Detection error tradeoff graphs (DET graphs, an alternative to the ROC)
- Logistic regression (a.k.a. logit model)
- Logit
- Probit model
- Multinomial probit
- Q–Q plot
- Continuous function
- Monotonic function
- Quantile function
- Sigmoid function
- Rankit analysis, also developed by Chester Bliss
- Ridit scoring
