= Rankit =

In statistics, rankits of a set of data are the expected values of the order statistics of a sample from the standard normal distribution the same size as the data. They are primarily used in the normal probability plot, a graphical technique for normality testing.

Sample normal probability plot; horizontal axis coordinates are rankits.

== Example ==
This is perhaps most readily understood by means of an example. If an i.i.d. sample of six items is taken from a normally distributed population with expected value 0 and variance 1 (the standard normal distribution) and then sorted into increasing order, the expected values of the resulting order statistics are:

−1.2672, −0.6418, −0.2016, 0.2016, 0.6418, 1.2672.

Suppose the numbers in a data set are

65, 75, 16, 22, 43, 40.

Then one may sort these and line them up with the corresponding rankits; in order they are

16, 22, 40, 43, 65, 75,

which yields the points:

data point	rankit
16	−1.2672
22	−0.6418
40	−0.2016
43	0.2016
65	0.6418
75	1.2672

These points are then plotted as the vertical and horizontal coordinates of a scatter plot.

=== Alternative method ===
Alternatively, rather than sort the data points, one may rank them, and rearrange the rankits accordingly. This yields the same pairs of numbers, but in a different order.

For:

65, 75, 16, 22, 43, 40,

the corresponding ranks are:

5, 6, 1, 2, 4, 3,

i.e., the number appearing first is the 5th-smallest, the number appearing second is 6th-smallest, the number appearing third is smallest, the number appearing fourth is 2nd-smallest, etc. One rearranges the expected normal order statistics accordingly, getting the rankits of this data set:

data point	rank	rankit
65	5	0.6418
75	6	1.2672
16	1	−1.2672
22	2	−0.6418
43	4	0.2016
40	3	−0.2016

== Rankit plot ==
A graph plotting the rankits on the horizontal axis and the data points on the vertical axis is called a rankit plot or a normal probability plot. Such a plot is necessarily nondecreasing. In large samples from a normally distributed population, such a plot will approximate a straight line. Substantial deviations from straightness are considered evidence against normality of the distribution.

Rankit plots are usually used to visually demonstrate whether data are from a specified probability distribution.

A rankit plot is a kind of Q–Q plot – it plots the order statistics (quantiles) of the sample against certain quantiles (the rankits) of the assumed normal distribution. Q–Q plots may use other quantiles for the normal distribution, however.

== History ==
The rankit plot and the word rankit was introduced by the biologist and statistician Chester Ittner Bliss (1899–1979).

== See also ==
- Probit analysis developed by C. I. Bliss in 1934.
