= Chester Ittner Bliss =

American statistician (1899–1979)

Chester I. Bliss
- Born: February 1, 1899; Springfield, Ohio, US
- Died: March 14, 1979 (aged 80); New Haven, Connecticut, US
- Education: Ohio State University; Columbia University
- Known for: Probit model Bliss independence
- Scientific career
- Fields: Biology; Statistics
- Thesis: Temperature Characteristics for Prepupal Development in Drosophila Melanogaster (1926)
- Doctoral advisor: Thomas Hunt Morgan

Chester Ittner Bliss (February 1, 1899 – March 14, 1979) was an American biologist, who is best known for his contributions to statistics. He was born in Springfield, Ohio in 1899 and died in 1979. He was the first secretary of the International Biometric Society.

== Academic qualifications ==
- Bachelor of Arts in Entomology from Ohio State University, 1921
- Master of Arts from Columbia University, 1922
- PhD from Columbia University, 1926

Remarkably, his statistical knowledge was largely self-taught and developed according to the problems he wanted to solve (Cochran & Finney 1979). Nevertheless, in 1942 he was elected as a Fellow of the American Statistical Association.

== Major contributions ==
The idea of the probit function was published by Bliss in a 1934 article in Science on how to treat data such as the percentage of a pest killed by a pesticide. Bliss proposed transforming the percentage killed into a "probability unit" (or "probit").

In 1939, Bliss introduced the approach now known as Bliss independence, a model for predicting the combined effect of independently acting agents that is widely used as a reference model for assessing synergy in drug combinations.

Arguably his most important contribution was the development, with Ronald Fisher, of an iterative approach to finding maximum likelihood estimates in the probit method of bioassay. Additional contributions in biological assay were work on the analysis of time-mortality data and of slope-ratio assays (Cochran & Finney 1979).

Bliss introduced the word rankit, meaning an expected normal order statistic.
