= Diaconis =

Diaconis can refer to:

- Paulus Diaconis (Paul the Deacon), 8th century monk and scholar
- Persi Diaconis, American magician turned mathematician
- Freedman–Diaconis rule, a statistical rule developed by Persi Diaconis and David Freedman
- John S. Diaconis, American attorney
