= List of protein tandem repeat annotation software =

Computational methods use different properties of protein sequences and structures to find, characterize and annotate protein tandem repeats.

== Sequence-based annotation methods ==
Name	Last update	Usage	Result types	Description	Open source?	Repeat type specific	Reference
ard2	2013	web	annotated sequence	Neural network	no	alpha-solenoid	
DECIPHER	2021	downloadable		Detection of tandem and/or interspersed repeats by orthology (DetectRepeats function in R package)	yes	no	
TRUST	2004	downloadable / web	unit position, multiple sequence alignment	Ab-initio determination of internal repeats in proteins. Exploits transitivity of alignments	?	no	
T-REKS	2009	downloadable / web	repeat unit	Clustering of lengths between identical short strings by using a K-means algorithm	yes	no	
HHRepID	2008	downloadable / web		Identification of repeats in protein sequences via HMM-HMM comparison to exploit evolutionary information in the form of multiple sequence alignments of homologs	no		
RADAR	2018	downloadable / web	unit position, multiple sequence alignment	RADAR identifies short composition biased and gapped approximate repeats, as well as complex repeat architectures involving many different types of repeats in a query sequence	yes	no	
XSTREAM	2007	web	unit position, different periods, multiple sequence alignment	data-mining tool designed to efficiently identify Tandem Repeat (TR) patterns in biological sequence data. The program uses a seed-extension strategy coupled with several post-processing algorithms to analyze FASTA-formatted protein or nucleotide sequences	no	no	
TRED	2007	downloadable		definition for tandem repeats over the edit distance and an efficient, deterministic algorithm for finding these repeats	no	no	
TRAL	2015	downloadable		Detects tandem repeats with both de novo software and sequence profile HMMs; statistical significance analysis of putative tandem repeats, and filtering of redundant predictions	yes		
DOTTER	1995	downloadable		Graphical dotplot program for detailed comparison of two sequences			
0J.PY							
PTRStalker	2012	downloadable	unit position, multiple sequence alignment	Ab-initio detection of fuzzy tandem repeats in protein amino acid sequences.		no	
TRDistiller	2015			Rapid sorting of tandem repeat (TR)- and no-TR-containing sequences			
REPRO	2000	web		Repeats detection based on a variation of the Smith-Waterman local alignment strategy followed by a graph-based iterative clustering procedure	no	no	
REP	2000	web			no	yes	

== Structure-based annotation methods ==
Name	Last update	Usage	Result types	Description	Open source?	Repeat type specific	Reference
TAPO	2016	web	unit position	Uses periodicities of atomic coordinates and other types of structural representation, including strings generated by conformational alphabets, residue contact maps, and arrangements of vectors of secondary structure elements	no	no	
SYMD	2014	galaxy	repeat geometry	Detects internally symmetric protein structures through an "alignment scan" procedure in which a protein structure is aligned to itself after circularly permuting the second copy by all possible number of residues	no	no	
RAPHAEL	2012	web	repeat probability	Reduce to three dimensional structure to a wave function. It then determines periodicity information.	no	no	
CE-SYMM	2021						
ProSTRIP	2010						
DAVROS	2004						
RQA	2009						
OPAAS	2006						
Gplus	2009						
REUPRED	2016						
ConSole	2015						
RepeatsDB-Lite	2017						
PRIGSA	2014						
Swelfe	2008						
Frustratometer	2021						
