= Dot matrix (disambiguation) =

A dot matrix is a 2-dimensional array of dots used to represent characters, symbols and images.

"Dot matrix" may also refer to:-

- Dot matrix printing (or impact matrix printing), a type of computer printing
- Dot matrix printers, computer printers that implement dot-matrix impact printing
- Dot-matrix display, a type of display device
- Dot plot (bioinformatics), a display convention for illustrating the alignment of two DNA or protein sequences.
- Dot Matrix, a character from the animated television series ReBoot
- Dot Matrix, a character from the film Spaceballs
- QR code, a matrix of square dots
