= Protein structure reconstruction =

Reconstruction of proteins from incomplete representations

Protein structure reconstruction refers to constructing an atomic-resolution model of a protein structure from incomplete coarse-grained representations like, for example, protein contact maps, positions of alpha carbon atoms only or backbone chain atoms only. There are many computational tools for protein structure reconstruction that are usually focused on specific reconstruction tasks which include: backbone reconstruction from alpha carbons, side-chains reconstruction from backbone chain atoms, hydrogen atoms reconstruction from heavy atoms positions and recovery of protein structure from contact maps.

== Software ==
Backbone reconstruction

- Pulchra
- BBQ
- PD2

Side chain reconstruction

- Pulchra
- SCWRL
