= List of software to detect low complexity regions in proteins =

Computational methods can study protein sequences to identify regions with low complexity, which can have particular properties regarding their function and structure.

Name	Last update	Usage	Description	Open source?	Reference
SAPS	1992	downloadable / web	It describes several protein sequence statistics for the evaluation of distinctive characteristics of residue content and arrangement in primary structures.	yes	
SEG	1993	downloadable	It is a two pass algorithm: first, identifies the LCR, and then performs local optimization by masking with Xs the LCRs	yes	
fLPS	2017	downloadable / web	It can readily handle very large protein data sets, such as might come from metagenomics projects. It is useful in searching for proteins with similar CBRs and for making functional inferences about CBRs for a protein of interest	yes	
CAST	2000	downloadable (as geneCAST) web	It identifies LCRs using iterative steps of local dynamic programming search and masking against a database of homopolymeric protein sequences.	yes	
SIMPLE	2002	downloadable web	It facilitates the quantification of the amount of simple sequence in proteins and determines the type of short motifs that show clustering above a certain threshold.	yes	
Oj.py	2001	on request	A tool for demarcating low complexity protein domains.	no	
DSR	2003	on request	It calculates complexity using reciprocal complexity.	no	
ScanCom	2003	on request	Calculates the compositional complexity using the linguistic complexity measure.	no	
CARD	2005	on request	Based on the complexity analysis of subsequences delimited by pairs of identical, repeating subsequences.	no	
BIAS	2006	downloadable / web	It uses discrete scan statistics that provide a highly accurate multiple test correction to compute analytical estimates of the significance of each compositionally biased segment.	yes	
GBA	2006	on request	A graph-based algorithm that constructs a graph of the sequence.	no	
SubSeqer	2008	web	A graph-based approach for the detection and identification of repetitive elements in low–complexity sequences.	no	
ANNIE	2009	web	This method creates an automation of the sequence analytic process.	no	
LPS-annotate	2011	on request	This algorithm defines compositional bias through a thorough search for lowest-probability subsequences (LPSs; Low Probability Sequences) and serves as workbench of tools now available to molecular biologists to generate hypotheses and inferences about the proteins that they are investigating.	no	
LCReXXXplorer	2015	web	A web platform to search, visualize and share data for low complexity regions in protein sequences. LCR-eXXXplorer offers tools for displaying LCRs from the UniProt/SwissProt knowledgebase, in combination with other relevant protein features, predicted or experimentally verified. Also, users may perform queries against a custom designed sequence/LCR-centric database.	no	
XNU	1993	downloadable	It uses the PAM120 scoring matrix for the calculation of complexity.	yes	
AlcoR	2022	downloadable	A compression-based and alignment-free tool for detecting low-complexity regions in biological data (see: Kolmogorov complexity § Compression)	yes	

For a comprehensive review on the various methods and tools, see.

In addition, a web meta-server named PLAtform of TOols for LOw COmplexity (PlaToLoCo) has been developed, for visualization and annotation of low complexity regions in proteins. PlaToLoCo integrates and collects the output of five different state-of-the-art tools for discovering LCRs and provides functional annotations such as domain detection, transmembrane segment prediction, and calculation of amino acid frequencies. Furthermore, the union or intersection of the results of the search on a query sequence can be obtained.

A Neural Network webserver, named LCR-hound has been developed to predict the function of prokaryotic and eukaryotic LCRs, based on their amino acid or di-amino acid (bigram) content.
