= Shanna Swan =

American epidemiologist (born 1936)

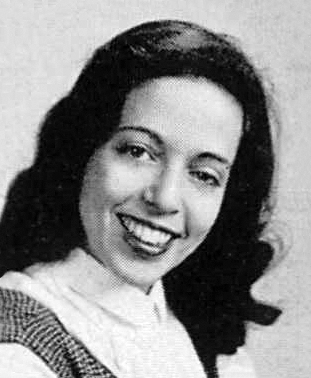
- High school yearbook portrait, 1954
- Born: Helen Wittenberg; May 1936 (age 90); Ohio, United States
- Other name: Helen Wittenberg
- Education: City College of New York; Columbia University; University of California, Berkeley
- Spouses: David A. Freedman (divorced); Henry Swan III (divorced); Steven R. Brown
- Children: Joshua Freedman; Deborah Freedman Lustig; Christo Swan
- Scientific career
- Fields: Environmental and Reproductive Epidemiology
- Workplaces: Environmental Health Sciences; University of Missouri; University of Rochester; Icahn School of Medicine at Mount Sinai
- Thesis: Limiting Distributions of Random Sums of Independent Random Variables (1963)
- Doctoral advisor: Lucien Le Cam

Shanna Helen Swan (born May 1936) is an American environmental and reproductive epidemiologist. She is currently the Director of the Action Science Initiative, part of the Million Marker Research Institute nonprofit. She is a retired Professor of Environmental Medicine and Public Health at the Icahn School of Medicine at Mount Sinai, where she had taught since April 2011 before retiring in August 2026. She is known for her research on environmental contributions to sperm count and the male infertility crisis.

== Early life ==
Swan was born in Ohio, United States. Her father, Rudolph Wittenberg, was German Jewish, and her mother, Goldie Ray Polturak, was American. She studied mathematics with a minor in logic at the City College of New York. She studied for her master's degree at Columbia University, working with Polish biostatistician Agnes Berger. She completed her doctorate in statistics, directed by Jerzy Neyman at the University of California, Berkeley.

== Career ==
After completing her doctorate, Swan worked for insurance company Kaiser Permanente investigating links between the oral contraceptive pill and conditions such as cervical cancer. She later worked for the California Department of Public Health, studying unexplained miscarriages in Santa Clara County. Swan joined a National Academy of Sciences committee in 1995 to research the impact of "hormonally active agents in the environment" on sperm counts between 1938 and 1991. She later worked at the University of Missouri and the University of Rochester.

She is Professor of Environmental Medicine and Public Health at the Icahn School of Medicine at Mount Sinai, where she has worked since April 2011.

In 2017, a paper on which Swan was senior author on environmental contributions to sperm count and the male infertility crisis received significant attention in both the popular media and scholarly literature, becoming the world's 26th most referenced scientific paper published that year. She has also researched the effects of environmental chemicals and pharmaceutical drugs on the development of the human reproductive system.

In 2021, with journalist Stacey Colino, Swan co-authored the book Count Down: How Our Modern World Is Altering Male and Female Reproductive Development, Threatening Sperm Counts, and Imperiling the Future of the Human Race, which discusses declining sperm counts in men and attributes this decline to endocrine-disrupting chemicals.

== Personal life ==
Swan was married to David A. Freedman, with whom she had two children: Joshua Freedman and Deborah Freedman Lustig. She had a third child, Christo Swan, after marrying Henry Swan III. She later married Steven R. Brown.
