= Sequence (biology) =

One-dimensional ordering of monomers, covalently linked within a biopolymer

A sequence in biology is the one-dimensional ordering of monomers, covalently linked within a biopolymer; it is also referred to as the primary structure of a biological macromolecule. While it can refer to many different molecules, the term sequence is most often used to refer to a DNA sequence or a protein sequence.

== See also ==
- Dot plot (bioinformatics)
- Sequence analysis
