= David A. Freedman =

Canadian statistician

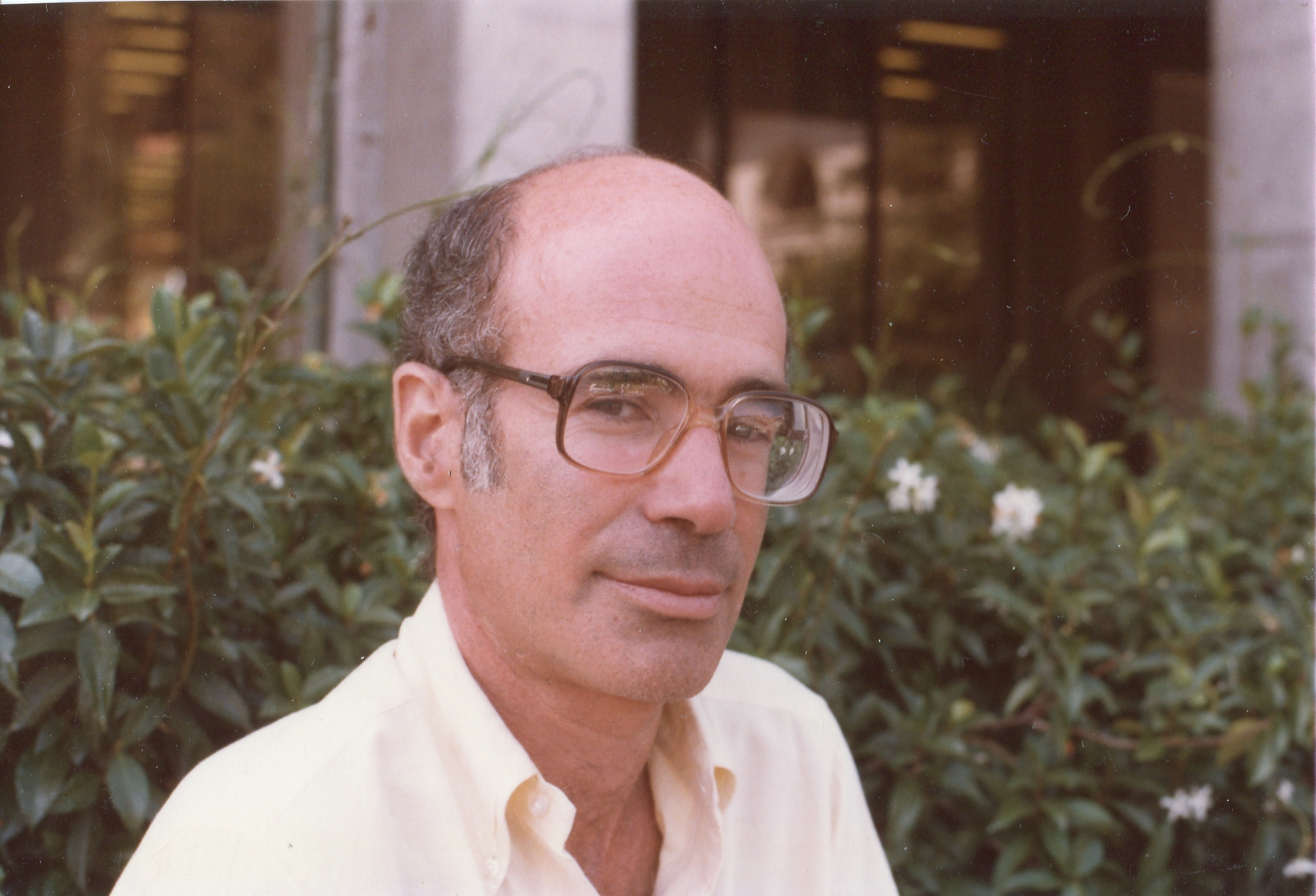
- Freedman in 1984
- Born: 5 March 1938; Montreal, Quebec, Canada
- Died: 17 October 2008 (aged 70); Berkeley, California, US
- Education: Princeton University; McGill University
- Spouses: Janet Macher; Shanna Swan (divorced)
- Children: Joshua Freedman; Deborah Freedman Lustig
- Scientific career
- Fields: Statistics
- Workplaces: University of California, Berkeley; Institute of Mathematical Statistics
- Doctoral advisor: William Feller

David Amiel Freedman (5 March 1938 – 17 October 2008) was a Professor of Statistics at the University of California, Berkeley. He was a distinguished mathematical statistician whose wide-ranging research included the analysis of martingale inequalities, Markov processes, de Finetti's theorem, consistency of Bayes estimators, sampling, the bootstrap, and procedures for testing and evaluating models. He published extensively on methods for causal inference and the behavior of standard statistical models under non-standard conditions – for example, how regression models behave when fitted to data from randomized experiments. Freedman also wrote widely on the application—and misapplication—of statistics in the social sciences, including epidemiology, public policy, and law.

== Biography and awards ==
Freedman was a fellow of the Institute of Mathematical Statistics and the American Statistical Association and an elected fellow of the American Academy of Arts and Sciences. He won the 2003 John J. Carty Award for the Advancement of Science from the National Academy of Sciences "for his profound contributions to the theory and practice of statistics, including rigorous foundations for Bayesian inference and trenchant analysis of census adjustment." He was a Fellow at the Miller Institute for Basic Research in Science in 1990, an Alfred P. Sloan Foundation Fellow in 1964–66, and a Canada Council Fellow at Imperial College London in 1960–61.

Freedman was born in Montreal, Quebec, Canada, on 5 March 1938. He received a B.Sc. from McGill University in 1958 and a M.A. and a Ph.D. from Princeton University in 1959 and 1960, respectively. He joined the University of California, Berkeley Department of Statistics in 1961 as a lecturer and was appointed to the research faculty in 1962. He remained at Berkeley his entire career. He started his professional life as a probabilist and mathematical statistician with Bayesian leanings but became one of the world's leading applied statisticians and a circumspect frequentist.

Freedman was a consulting or testifying expert on statistics in disputes involving employment discrimination, fair loan practices, voting rights, duplicate signatures on petitions, railroad taxation, ecological inference, flight patterns of golf balls, price scanner errors, bovine spongiform encephalopathy (mad cow disease), and sampling. He consulted for the Bank of Canada, the Carnegie Commission, the City of San Francisco, the County of Los Angeles, and the Federal Reserve, as well as the U.S. departments of energy, treasury, justice, and commerce. Freedman and his colleague Kenneth Wachter testified to the United States Congress and the courts against adjusting the 1980 and 1990 censuses using estimates of differential undercounts. A 1990 lawsuit that sought to compel the United States Department of Commerce to adjust the census was heard on appeal by the U.S. Supreme Court, which ruled unanimously in favor of the Commerce Department and Freedman and Wachter's analysis. With David Kaye, Freedman wrote a widely used primer on statistics for lawyers and judges published by the Federal Judicial Center, the education and research agency for the United States federal courts.

In addition to his work in forensic statistics, Freedman had a broad impact on the application of statistics to important medical, social, and public policy issues, such as clinical trials, epidemiology, economic models, and the interpretation of scientific experiments and observational studies. In his applied work, Freedman emphasized exposing and checking the assumptions that underlie standard methods and understanding how those methods behave when the assumptions are false. He characterized circumstances in which the methods continue to perform well and those where they break down—regardless of the quality of the data. Two of his earlier results (1963 and 1965) investigate whether or not and under what circumstances a Bayesian learning approach is consistent, i.e. when does the prior converge to the true probability distribution given sufficiently many observed data. In particular, the 1965 paper with the innocent title "On the asymptotic behaviour of Bayes estimates in the discrete case II" finds the rather disappointing answer that when sampling from a countably infinite population the Bayesian procedure fails almost everywhere, i.e., one does not obtain the true distribution asymptotically. This situation is quite different from the finite case when the (discrete) random variable takes only finite many values and the Bayesian method is consistent in agreement with earlier findings of Doob (1948).

Freedman was the author or co-author of 200 articles, 20 technical reports and six books, including an important introductory statistics textbook, Statistics (2007), with Robert Pisani and Roger Purves, which has gone through four editions. The late Amos Tversky of Stanford University observed that "This is a great book. It is the best introduction to how to think about statistical issues...." It has a "wealth of real-world examples that illuminate principles and applications....a classic." Freedman's Statistical Models: Theory and Practice (2005) is an advanced text on statistical modeling that integrates extensive examples and statistical theory.

Landmark articles by Freedman include "Statistical Models and Shoe Leather" (1991), "What is the Chance of an Earthquake?" (2003), "Methods for Census 2000 and Statistical Adjustments" (2007), and "On Types of Scientific Enquiry: The Role of Qualitative Reasoning" (2008).

== Personal life ==
Freedman was married to epidemiologist Shanna Swan, with whom he had two children: Joshua Freedman and Deborah Freedman Lustig. They later divorced.

== Bibliography ==
- David A. Freedman (1963), "On the asymptotic behaviour of Bayes estimates in the discrete case I". The Annals of Mathematical Statistics, vol. 34, pp. 1386–1403.
- David A. Freedman (1965), "On the asymptotic behaviour of Bayes estimates in the discrete case II". The Annals of Mathematical Statistics, vol. 36, pp. 454–456.
- Freedman, David; Pisani, Robert; Purves, Roger (2007). Statistics (4th ed.). New York: Norton. ISBN 978-0-393-92972-0. Archived from the original on 2008-07-06.
- Freedman, David A. (2009). Statistical models: Theory and practice (second ed.). Cambridge University Press.
- Freedman, David A. (2010). Collier, David; Sekhon, Jasjeet S.; Stark, Philip B. (eds.). Statistical models and causal inferences: A dialogue with the social sciences. Cambridge University Press. This includes the following reprinted papers, some of which have changes.
  - "Statistical Models and Shoe Leather" (1991). Sociological Methodology, vol. 21, pp. 291–313.
  - "What is the Chance of an Earthquake?" (2003). With Philip B. Stark. Earthquake Science and Seismic Risk Reduction, NATO Science Series IV: Earth and Environmental Sciences, vol. 32, pp. 201–13.1- (preprint)
  - "Methods for Census 2000 and Statistical Adjustments" (2007). With Kenneth Wachter. Social Science Methodology, Sage, pp. 232–45.
  - "On Types of Scientific Enquiry: The Role of Qualitative Reasoning" (2008). Oxford Handbook of Political Methodology, Oxford University Press.
  - "Survival analysis: A Primer". The American Statistician (2008) 62: 110–119.

== See also ==
- Freedman–Diaconis rule
- Freedman's paradox
