= Freedman's paradox =

Statistical paradox

In statistical analysis, Freedman's paradox, named after David Freedman, is a problem in model selection whereby predictor variables with no relationship to the dependent variable can pass tests of significance – both individually via a t-test, and jointly via an F-test for the significance of the regression. Freedman demonstrated (through simulation and asymptotic calculation) that this is a common occurrence when the number of variables is similar to the number of data points.

Specifically, if the dependent variable and k regressors are independent normal variables, and there are n observations, then as k and n jointly go to infinity in the ratio k/n=ρ,

1. the R^{2} goes to ρ,
2. the F-statistic for the overall regression goes to 1.0, and
3. the number of spuriously significant regressors goes to αk where α is the chosen critical probability (probability of Type I error for a regressor). This third result is intuitive because it says that the number of Type I errors equals the probability of a Type I error on an individual parameter times the number of parameters for which significance is tested.

More recently, new information-theoretic estimators have been developed in an attempt to reduce this problem, in addition to the accompanying issue of model selection bias, whereby estimators of predictor variables that have a weak relationship with the response variable are biased.
