= Histogram =

Graphical representation of the distribution of numerical data

In this histogram, height is divided into bins of equal width (5 feet).

A histogram is a visual representation of the distribution of quantitative data. To construct a histogram, the first step is to "bin" (or "bucket") the range of values— divide the entire range of values into a series of intervals—and then count how many values fall into each interval. The bins are usually specified as consecutive, non-overlapping intervals of a variable. The bins (intervals) are adjacent and are typically (but not required to be) of equal size.

Histograms give a rough sense of the density of the underlying distribution of the data, and often for density estimation: estimating the probability density function of the underlying variable. The total area of a histogram used for probability density is always normalized to 1. If the length of the intervals on the x-axis are all 1, then a histogram is identical to a relative frequency plot.

Histograms are sometimes confused with bar charts. In a histogram, each bin is for a different range of values, so altogether the histogram illustrates the distribution of values. But in a bar chart, each bar is for a different category of observations (e.g., each bar might be for a different population), so altogether the bar chart can be used to compare different categories. Some authors recommend that bar charts always have gaps between the bars to clarify that they are not histograms.

== Etymology ==
The term histogram was first introduced by Karl Pearson, the founder of mathematical statistics, in lectures delivered in 1892 at University College London. Pearson's term is sometimes incorrectly said to combine the Greek root γραμμα (gramma; 'figure' or 'drawing') with the root ἱστορία (historia; 'inquiry or 'history'). Alternatively the root ἱστίον (histion) is also proposed, meaning 'web' or 'tissue' (as in histology, the study of biological tissue). Both of these etymologies are incorrect, and in fact Pearson, who knew Ancient Greek well, derived the term from a different if homophonous Greek root, ἱστός ('something set upright' or 'mast'), referring to the vertical bars in the graph. Pearson's new term was embedded in a series of other analogous neologisms, such as stigmogram and radiogram.

Pearson himself noted in 1895 that, although the term histogram was new, the type of graph it designates was "a common form of graphical representation". In fact the technique of using a bar graph to represent statistical measurements was devised by the Scottish economist, William Playfair, in his Commercial and political atlas (1786).

== Examples ==
This is the data for the histogram to the right, using 500 items:

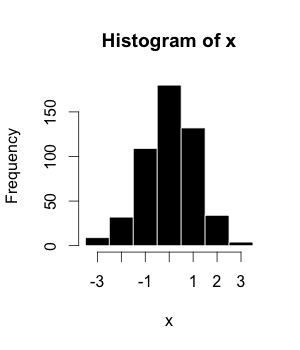

Bin/Interval	Count/Frequency
−3.5 to −2.51	9
−2.5 to −1.51	32
−1.5 to −0.51	109
−0.5 to 0.49	180
0.5 to 1.49	132
1.5 to 2.49	34
2.5 to 3.49	4

The words used to describe the patterns in a histogram are: "symmetric", "skewed left" or "right", "unimodal", "bimodal" or "multimodal".

Symmetric, unimodal

Skewed right

Skewed left

Bimodal

Multimodal

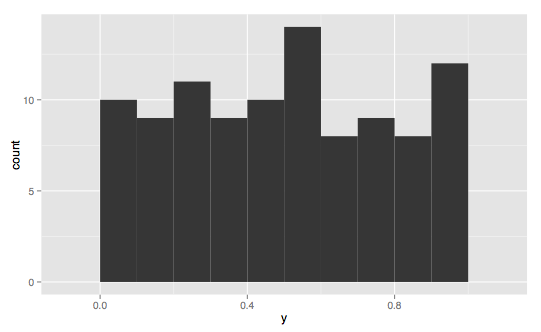
Symmetric

It is a good idea to plot the data using several different bin widths to learn more about it. Here is an example on tips given in a restaurant.

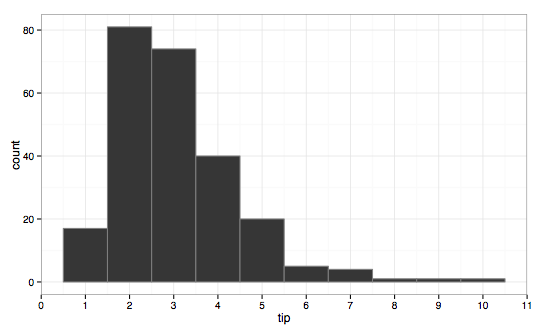
Tips using a $1 bin width, skewed right, unimodal

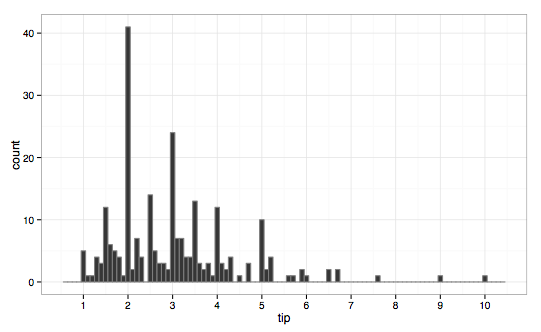
Tips using a 10c bin width, still skewed right, multimodal with modes at $ and 50c amounts, indicates rounding, also some outliers

The U.S. Census Bureau found that there were 124 million people who work outside of their homes. Using their data on the time occupied by travel to work, the table below shows the absolute number of people who responded with travel times "at least 30 but less than 35 minutes" is higher than the numbers for the categories above and below it. This is likely due to people rounding their reported journey time. The problem of reporting values as somewhat arbitrarily rounded numbers is a common phenomenon when collecting data from people.

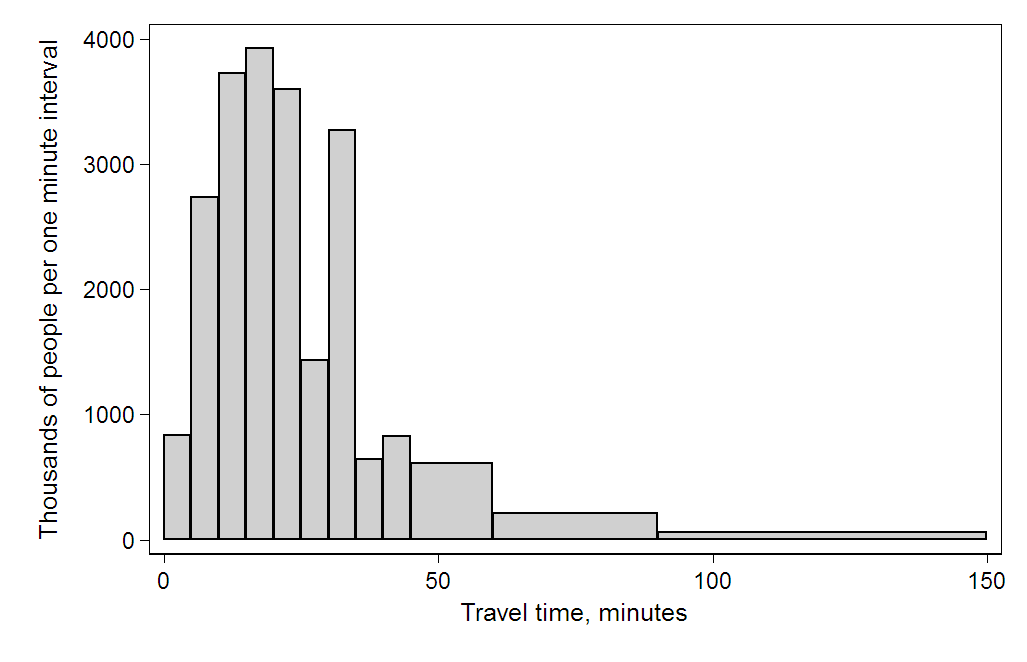
Histogram of travel time (to work), US 2000 census. Area under the curve equals the total number of cases. This diagram uses Q/width from the table.

Data by absolute numbers
Interval	Width	Quantity	Quantity/width
0	5	4180	836
5	5	13687	2737
10	5	18618	3723
15	5	19634	3926
20	5	17981	3596
25	5	7190	1438
30	5	16369	3273
35	5	3212	642
40	5	4122	824
45	15	9200	613
60	30	6461	215
90	60	3435	57

This histogram shows the number of cases per unit interval as the height of each block, so that the area of each block is equal to the number of people in the survey who fall into its category. The area under the curve represents the total number of cases (124 million). This type of histogram shows absolute numbers, with Q in thousands.

Histogram of travel time (to work), US 2000 census. Area under the curve equals 1. This diagram uses Q/total/width (crowding) from the table. The height of a block represents crowding which is defined as - percentage per horizontal unit.

Data by proportion
Interval	Width	Quantity (Q)	Q/total/width
0	5	4180	0.0067
5	5	13687	0.0221
10	5	18618	0.0300
15	5	19634	0.0316
20	5	17981	0.0290
25	5	7190	0.0116
30	5	16369	0.0264
35	5	3212	0.0052
40	5	4122	0.0066
45	15	9200	0.0049
60	30	6461	0.0017
90	60	3435	0.0005

This histogram differs from the first only in the vertical scale. The area of each block is the fraction of the total that each category represents, and the total area of all the bars is equal to 1 (the fraction meaning "all"). The curve displayed is a simple density estimate. This version shows proportions, and is also known as a unit area histogram.

In other words, a histogram represents a frequency distribution by means of rectangles whose widths represent class intervals and whose areas are proportional to the corresponding frequencies: the height of each is the average frequency density for the interval. The intervals are placed together in order to show that the data represented by the histogram, while exclusive, is also contiguous. (E.g., in a histogram it is possible to have two connecting intervals of 10.5–20.5 and 20.5–33.5, but not two connecting intervals of 10.5–20.5 and 22.5–32.5. Empty intervals are represented as empty and not skipped.)

== Mathematical definitions ==
An ordinary and a cumulative histogram of the same data. The data shown is a random sample of 10,000 points from a normal distribution with a mean of 0 and a standard deviation of 1.

The data used to construct a histogram are generated via a function m_{i} that counts the number of observations that fall into each of the disjoint categories (known as bins). Thus, if we let n be the total number of observations and k be the total number of bins, the histogram data m_{i} meet the following conditions:

$$n = \sum_{i=1}^k{m_i}.$$

A histogram can be thought of as a simplistic kernel density estimation, which uses a kernel to smooth frequencies over the bins. This yields a smoother probability density function, which will in general more accurately reflect distribution of the underlying variable. The density estimate could be plotted as an alternative to the histogram, and is usually drawn as a curve rather than a set of boxes. Histograms are nevertheless preferred in applications, when their statistical properties need to be modeled. The correlated variation of a kernel density estimate is very difficult to describe mathematically, while it is simple for a histogram where each bin varies independently.

An alternative to kernel density estimation is the average shifted histogram, which is fast to compute and gives a smooth curve estimate of the density without using kernels.

=== Cumulative histogram ===
A cumulative histogram: a mapping that counts the cumulative number of observations in all of the bins up to the specified bin. That is, the cumulative histogram M_{i} of a histogram m_{j} can be defined as:

$$M_i = \sum_{j=1}^i{m_j}.$$

=== Number of bins and width ===
There is no "best" number of bins, and different bin sizes can reveal different features of the data. Grouping data is at least as old as Graunt's work in the 17th century, but no systematic guidelines were given until Sturges's work in 1926.

Using wider bins where the density of the underlying data points is low reduces noise due to sampling randomness; using narrower bins where the density is high (so the signal drowns the noise) gives greater precision to the density estimation. Thus varying the bin-width within a histogram can be beneficial. Nonetheless, equal-width bins are widely used.

Some theoreticians have attempted to determine an optimal number of bins, but these methods generally make strong assumptions about the shape of the distribution. Depending on the actual data distribution and the goals of the analysis, different bin widths may be appropriate, so experimentation is usually needed to determine an appropriate width. There are, however, various useful guidelines and rules of thumb.

The number of bins k can be assigned directly or can be calculated from a suggested bin width h as:

Histogram data represented with different bin widths

$$k = \left \lceil \frac{\max x - \min x}{h} \right \rceil.$$

The braces indicate the ceiling function.

==== Square-root choice ====
$$k = \lceil \sqrt{n} \rceil \,$$

which takes the square root of the number of data points in the sample and rounds to the next integer. This rule is suggested by a number of elementary statistics textbooks and widely implemented in many software packages.

==== Sturges's formula ====
Sturges's rule is derived from a binomial distribution and implicitly assumes an approximately normal distribution.

$$k = \lceil \log_2 n \rceil+ 1 , \,$$

Sturges's formula implicitly bases bin sizes on the range of the data, and can perform poorly if n < 30, because the number of bins will be small—less than seven—and unlikely to show trends in the data well. On the other extreme, Sturges's formula may overestimate bin width for very large datasets, resulting in oversmoothed histograms. It may also perform poorly if the data is not normally distributed.

When compared to Scott's rule and the Terrell-Scott rule, two other widely accepted formulas for histogram bins, the output of Sturges's formula is closest when n ≈ 100.

==== Rice rule ====
$$k = \lceil 2 \sqrt[3]{n}\rceil$$

The Rice rule is presented as a simple alternative to Sturges's rule.

==== Doane's formula ====
Doane's formula is a modification of Sturges's formula which attempts to improve its performance with non-normal data.

$$k = 1 + \log_2( n ) + \log_2 \left( 1 +  \frac { |g_1| }{\sigma_{g_1}} \right)$$

where $g_1$ is the estimated 3rd-moment-skewness of the distribution and

$$\sigma_{g_1} = \sqrt { \frac { 6(n-2) }{ (n+1)(n+3) } }$$

==== Scott's normal reference rule ====
Bin width $h$ is given by

$$h = \frac{3.49 \hat \sigma}{\sqrt[3]{n}},$$

where $\hat \sigma$ is the sample standard deviation. Scott's normal reference rule is optimal for random samples of normally distributed data, in the sense that it minimizes the integrated mean squared error of the density estimate. This is the default rule used in Microsoft Excel.

==== Terrell–Scott rule ====
$$k = \sqrt[3]{2n}$$

The Terrell–Scott rule is not a normal reference rule. It gives the minimum number of bins required for an asymptotically optimal histogram, where optimality is measured by the integrated mean squared error. The bound is derived by finding the 'smoothest' possible density, which turns out to be $\frac 3 4 (1-x^2)$. Any other density will require more bins, hence the above estimate is also referred to as the 'oversmoothed' rule. The similarity of the formulas and the fact that Terrell and Scott were at Rice University when the proposed it suggests that this is also the origin of the Rice rule.

==== Freedman–Diaconis rule ====
The Freedman–Diaconis rule gives bin width $h$ as:

$$h =  2\frac{\operatorname{IQR}(x)}{\sqrt[3]{n}},$$

which is based on the interquartile range, denoted by IQR. It replaces 3.5σ of Scott's rule with 2 IQR, which is less sensitive than the standard deviation to outliers in data.

==== Minimizing cross-validation estimated squared error ====
This approach of minimizing integrated mean squared error from Scott's rule can be generalized beyond normal distributions, by using leave-one out cross validation:

$$\underset{h}{\operatorname{arg\,min}} \hat{J}(h) = \underset{h}{\operatorname{arg\,min}} \left( \frac{2}{(n-1)h} - \frac{n+1}{n^2(n-1)h} \sum_k N_k^2 \right)$$

Here, $N_k$ is the number of datapoints in the kth bin, and choosing the value of h that minimizes J will minimize integrated mean squared error.

==== Shimazaki and Shinomoto's choice ====
The choice is based on minimization of an estimated L^{2} risk function

$$\underset{h}{\operatorname{arg\,min}} \frac{ 2 \bar{m} - v } {h^2}$$

where $\textstyle \bar{m}$ and $\textstyle v$ are mean and biased variance of a histogram with bin-width $\textstyle h$, $\textstyle \bar{m}=\frac{1}{k} \sum_{i=1}^{k} m_i$ and $\textstyle v= \frac{1}{k} \sum_{i=1}^{k} (m_i - \bar{m})^2$.

==== Variable bin widths ====
Rather than choosing evenly spaced bins, for some applications it is preferable to vary the bin width. This avoids bins with low counts. A common case is to choose equiprobable bins, where the number of samples in each bin is expected to be approximately equal. The bins may be chosen according to some known distribution or may be chosen based on the data so that each bin has $\approx n/k$ samples. When plotting the histogram, the frequency density is used for the dependent axis. While all bins have approximately equal area, the heights of the histogram approximate the density distribution.

For equiprobable bins, the following rule for the number of bins is suggested:

$$k = 2 n^{2/5}$$

This choice of bins is motivated by maximizing the power of a Pearson chi-squared test testing whether the bins do contain equal numbers of samples. More specifically, for a given confidence interval $\alpha$ it is recommended to choose between 1/2 and 1 times the following equation:

$$k = 4 \left( \frac{2 n^2}{\Phi^{-1}(\alpha)} \right)^\frac{1}{5}$$

Where $\Phi^{-1}$ is the probit function. Following this rule for $\alpha = 0.05$ would give between $1.88n^{2/5}$ and $3.77n^{2/5}$; the coefficient of 2 is chosen as an easy-to-remember value from this broad optimum.

==== Remark ====
A good reason why the number of bins should be proportional to $\sqrt[3]{n}$ is the following: suppose that the data are obtained as $n$ independent realizations of a bounded probability distribution with smooth density. Then the histogram remains equally "rugged" as $n$ tends to infinity. If $s$ is the "width" of the distribution (e. g., the standard deviation or the inter-quartile range), then the number of units in a bin (the frequency) is of order $n h/s$ and the relative standard error is of order $\sqrt{s/(n h)}$. Compared to the next bin, the relative change of the frequency is of order $h/s$ provided that the derivative of the density is non-zero. These two are of the same order if $h$ is of order $s/\sqrt[3]{n}$, so that $k$ is of order $\sqrt[3]{n}$. This simple cubic root choice can also be applied to bins with non-constant widths.

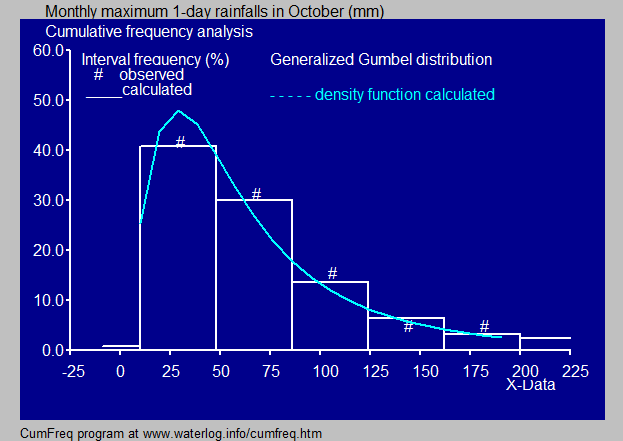
Histogram and density function for a Gumbel distribution

== Applications ==
- In hydrology the histogram and estimated density function of rainfall and river discharge data, analysed with a probability distribution, are used to gain insight in their behaviour and frequency of occurrence. An example is shown in the blue figure.
- In many Digital image processing programs there is an histogram tool, which show you the distribution of the contrast / brightness of the pixels.
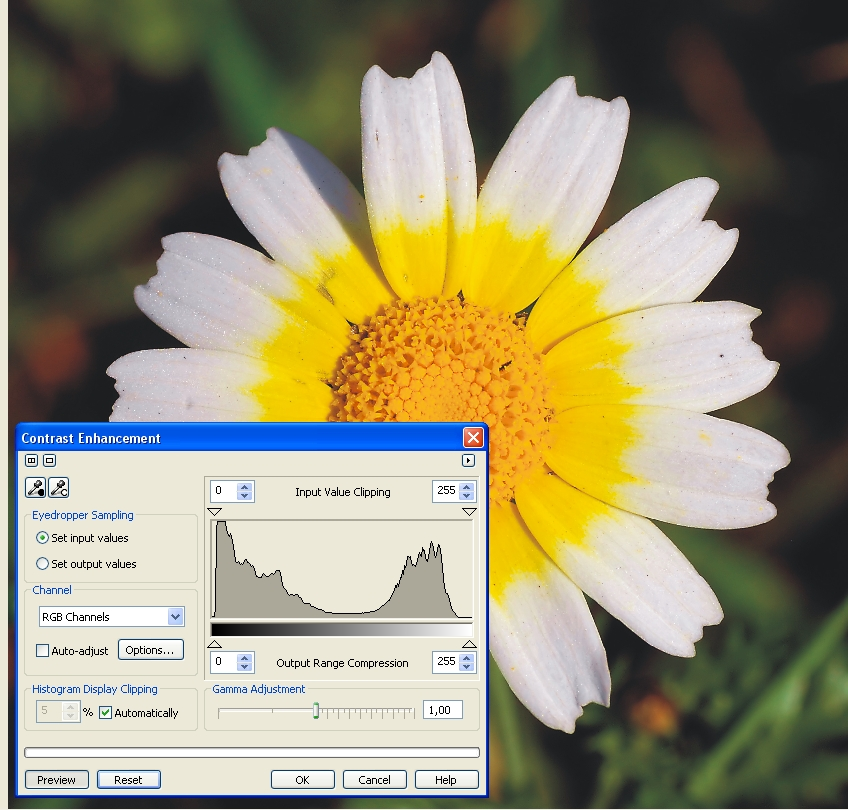
  Histogram of contrast

== See also ==
- Data and information visualization
- Data binning
- Density estimation
  - Kernel density estimation, a smoother but more complex method of density estimation
- Entropy estimation
- Freedman–Diaconis rule
- Image histogram
- Pareto chart
- Seven basic tools of quality
- V-optimal histograms
