= Low complexity regions in proteins =

Unusual regions in protein sequences

Low complexity regions (LCRs) in protein sequences, also defined in some contexts as compositionally biased regions (CBRs), are regions in protein sequences that differ from the composition and complexity of most proteins that is normally associated with globular structure. LCRs have different properties from normal regions regarding structure, function and evolution.

== Structure ==
LCRs were originally thought to be unstructured and flexible linkers that served to separate the structured (and functional) domains of complex proteins, but they are also capable of forming secondary structures, like helices (more often) and even sheets. They may play a structural role in proteins such as collagens, myosin, keratins, silk, cell wall proteins. Tandem repeats of short oligopeptides that are rich in glycine, proline, serine or threonine are capable of forming flexible structures that bind ligands under certain pH and temperature conditions. Proline is a well-known alpha-helix breaker, however, amino acid repeats composed of proline may form poly-proline helices.

== Functions ==
LCRs were originally thought as 'junk' regions or as neutral linkers between domains; however, experimental and computational evidence increasingly indicates that they may play important adaptive and conserved roles, relevant to biotechnology, heterologous protein expression, medicine, as well as to our understanding of protein evolution.

LCRs of eukaryotic proteins have been involved in human diseases, especially neurodegenerative ones, where they tend to form amyloids in humans and other eukaryotes.

They have been reported to have adhesive roles, function in excreted sticky proteins used for prey capture, or have roles as transducers of molecular movement, e.g. in the prokaryotic TonB/TolA systems.

LCRs may form surfaces for interaction with phospholipid bilayers, or as positive charge clusters for DNA binding, or as negative or even histidine-acidic charge clusters for coordinating calcium, magnesium or zinc ions.

They may also play important roles in protein translation, as tRNA 'sponges', slowing down translation in order to allow time for the correct folding of the nascent polypeptide chain. They may even function as frame-shift checkpoints, by shifting to an unusual amino acid content that makes the protein highly unstable or insoluble, which in turn triggers fast recycling, before any further cellular damage.

Analyses on model and non-model eukaryotic proteomes have revealed that LCRs are frequently found in proteins involved in binding of nucleic acids (DNA or RNA), in transcription, receptor activity, development, reproduction and immunity whereas metabolic proteins are depleted of LCRs. A bioinformatics study of the UniProt annotation of LCR containing proteins observed that 44% (9751/22259) of Bacterial and 44% (662/1521) of Archaeal LCRs are detected in proteins of unknown function, however, a significant number of proteins of known function (from many different species), especially those involved in translation and the ribosome, nucleic acid binding, metal-ion binding, and protein folding were also found to contain LCRs.

== Properties ==
LCRs are more abundant in eukaryotes, but they also have a significant presence in many prokaryotes. On average, 0.05 and 0.07% of the bacterial and archaeal proteomes (total amino acids of LCRs in a given proteome/total amino acids of that proteome) form LCRs whereas for five model eukaryotic proteomes (human, fruitfly, yeast, fission yeast, Arabidopsis) this coverage was significantly higher (on average, 0.4%; between 2 and 23 times higher than prokaryotes).

Eukaryotic LCRs tend to be longer than prokaryotic LCRs. The average size of a eukaryotic LCR is 42 amino acids long, whereas bacterial, archaeal and phage LCRs are 38, 36 and 33 amino acids long, respectively.

In the Archaea, the halobacterium Natrialba magadii has the highest number of LCRs and the highest enrichment for LCRs. In Bacteria, Enhygromyxa salina, a delta proteobacterium that belongs to myxobacteria has the highest number of LCRs and the highest enrichment for LCRs. Intriguingly, four of the top five bacteria with the highest enrichment for LCRs are also myxobacteria.

The three most enriched amino acids within LCRs of Bacteria are proline, glycine and alanine, whereas in Archaea they are threonine, aspartate and proline. In Phages, they are alanine, glycine and proline. Glycine and proline emerge as very enriched amino acids in all three evolutionary lineages, whereas alanine is highly enriched in Bacteria and Phages but not enriched in Archaea. On the other hand, hydrophobic (M, I, L, V) and aromatic amino acids (F, Y, W) as well as cysteine, arginine and asparagine are heavily under-represented in LCRs. Very similar trends for amino acids with a high (G, A, P, S, Q) and low (M, V, L, I, W, F, R, C) occurrence within LCRs have been observed in eukaryotes as well. This observed pattern of certain amino acids being over-represented (enriched for) or under-represented in LCRs could be partially explained by the energy cost for synthesis or metabolism of each of the amino acids. Another possible explanation, which does not exclude the previous explanation of energy cost could be the reactivity of certain amino acids. For example, Cysteine is a very reactive amino acid that would not be tolerated in high numbers within a small region of a protein. Similarly, extremely hydrophobic regions can form non-specific protein–protein interactions among themselves and with other moderately hydrophobic regions in mammalian cells. Thus, their presence may disturb the balance of protein-protein interaction networks within the cell, especially if the carrier proteins are highly expressed. A third explanation may be based on micro-evolutionary forces and, more specifically, on the bias of DNA polymerase slippage for certain di- tri- or tetra-nucleotides .

=== Amino acid enrichment for certain functional categories of LCRs ===
A bioinformatics analysis of prokaryotic LCRs identified 5 types of amino acid enrichment, for certain functional categories of LCRs:

- Proteins with GO terms related to polysaccharide binding and processing were enriched for serine and threonine in their LCRs.
- Proteins with GO terms related to RNA binding and processing were enriched for arginine in their LCRs.
- Proteins with GO terms related to DNA binding and processing were especially enriched for lysine, but also for glycine, tyrosine, phenylalanine and glutamine in their LCRs.
- Proteins with GO terms related to metal binding and more specifically to cobalt or nickel-binding were enriched mostly for histidine but also for aspartate in their LCRs.
- Proteins with GO terms related to protein folding were enriched for glycine, methionine and phenylalanine in their LCRs.

Based on the above observations and analyses, a Neural Network webserver named LCR-hound has been developed to predict LCRs and their function.

== Evolution ==
LCRs are very interesting from a micro and macro evolutionary perspective. They may be generated by DNA slippage, recombination and repair. Thus, they are linked to recombination hotspots and may even possibly facilitate cross-over. By originating from genetic instability, they may cause, at the DNA level, a certain region of the protein to expand or contract and even cause frame-shifts (phase-variants) that affect microbial pathogenicity or provide raw material for evolution. Most intriguingly, they may provide a window into the very early evolution of life. During early evolution, when only few amino acids were available and the primary genetic code was still expanding its repertoire, the first proteins were assumed to be short, repetitive and therefore, of low complexity. Thus, modern LCRs could represent primordial aspects of the evolution towards the protein world and may provide clues about the functions of the early proto-peptides.

Most studies have focused on the evolution, functional and structural role of eukaryotic LCRs. However, a comprehensive study of prokaryotic LCRs from many diverse prokaryotic lineages provides a unique opportunity to understanding the origin, evolution and nature of these regions. Due to the high effective population size and short generation times of prokaryotes, the de novo emergence of a mildly or moderately deleterious amino acid repeat or LCR should quickly be filtered out by strong selective forces. This must be especially the case for LCRs found in highly expressed proteins, since they should also have a great impact on the energy burden of protein translation. Thus, any prokaryotic LCRs that constitute evolutionary accidents with no functional significance should not be fixed by genetic drift and consequently should not demonstrate any levels of conservation among moderately distant evolutionary relatives. On the contrary, any LCR found among homologs of several moderately distant prokaryotic species should very probably reserve a functional role.

== LCRs and the protopeptides of the early genetic code ==
The amino acids with the highest frequency in LCRs are glycine and alanine, with their respective codons GGC and GCC being the most frequent, as well as complementary. In eukaryotes and more specifically in chordates (such as human, mouse, chicken, zebrafish and sea squirt), alanine- and glycine-rich LCRs are over-represented in recently formed LCRs and probably are better tolerated by the cell. Intriguingly, it has also been suggested that they represent the very first two amino acids and codons of the early genetic code. Thus, these two codons and their respective amino acids must have been constituents of the earliest oligopeptides, with a length of 10–55 amino acids and very low complexity. Based on several different criteria and sources of data, Higgs and Pudritz suggest G, A, D, E, V, S, P, I, L, T as the early amino acids of the genetic code. Trifonov's work largely agrees with this categorization and proposes that the early amino acids in chronological order are G, A, D, V, S, P, E, L, T, R. An evolutionary analysis observed that many of the amino acids of the suggested very early genetic code (with the exception of the hydrophobic ones) are significantly enriched in bacterial LCRs. Most of the later additions to the genetic code are significantly under-represented in bacterial LCRs. They thus hypothesize and propose that, in a cell-free environment, the early genetic code may have also produced low complexity oligo-peptides from valine and leucine. However, later on, within a more complex cellular environment, these highly hydrophobic LCRs became inappropriate or even toxic from a protein interaction perspective and have been selected against ever since. In addition, they further hypothesize that the very early protopeptides did not have a nucleic acid binding role, because DNA and RNA-binding LCRs are highly enriched in glycine, arginine and lysine, however, arginine and lysine are not among the amino acids of the proposed early genetic code.

== Detection methods ==
Low complexity regions in proteins can be computationally detected from sequence using various methods and definitions, as reviewed in. Among the most popular methodologies to identify LCRs is by measuring their Shannon entropy. The lower the value of the calculated entropy, the more homogeneous the region is in terms of amino acid content. In addition, a Neural Network webserver, LCR-hound has been developed to predict the function of an LCR, based on its amino acid or di-amino acid (bigram) content. Compression-based tools have also been used to perform such analysis providing higher sensitivity while mitigating the risk of overestimation inherent in other methods.
