= Appropriation =

Appropriate may refer to

- Appropriate (play), a play by Branden Jacobs-Jenkins

Appropriateness may refer to

- Age appropriateness
- Logic of appropriateness
- Propriety

Appropriation may refer to:

- Appropriation (art), the use of pre-existing objects or images with little or no transformation
- Appropriation (law) as a component of government spending
- Appropriation of knowledge

- Appropriation (sociology) in relation to the spread of knowledge

- Appropriation (ecclesiastical) of the income of a benefice
- Cultural appropriation, the borrowing of an element of cultural expression of one group by another
  - Reappropriation, the use with a sense of pride (of a negative word or object) by a member of the offended group
- Original appropriation, origination of human ownership of previously unowned natural resources such as land

Other terms include:

- The personality rights tort of appropriation, one form of invasion of privacy
- Appropriation (By Any Other Name), by The Long Blondes (2005)

== See also ==
- Appropriation Act
- Appropriation bill
- Appropriations bill (United States)
