= Learning curve (disambiguation) =

A learning curve is a relationship of the duration or the degree of effort invested in learning and experience with the resulting progress, considered as an exploratory discovery process.

Learning Curve may also refer to:

- Experience curve effects, regularly observed reduction in costs of manufacturing and delivery with increased experience. Associated mathematical models
- "Learning Curve" (Babylon 5), an episode of the science fiction television series Babylon 5
- "Learning Curve" (Stargate SG-1), an episode of the science fiction television series Stargate SG-1
- "Learning Curve" (Voyager episode), an episode of the science fiction television series Star Trek: Voyager
- The Learning Curve, a 2001 thriller film
- Learning Curve (1998 film), a 1998 film about a substitute teacher in a public school, also goes by the name 'Detention 1998'
- Learning Curve, an album by British DJ DJ Rap
- Learning Curve Brands, a designer and manufacturer of products for infants and children of all ages, a subsidiary of RC2 Corporation, acquired by Takara Tomy in 2011
- Learning curve (machine learning), a tool to find out how much a machine learning model benefits from adding more training data or epochs
- Learning Curve, a story arc in the fortieth series of Casualty

See also:

- Learning rate
