= Grok =

Neologism coined by Robert Heinlein

Grok (/ˈɡrɒk/) is a neologism coined by the American writer Robert A. Heinlein in his 1961 science fiction novel Stranger in a Strange Land. The Oxford English Dictionary summarizes the meaning of grok as "to understand intuitively or by empathy, to establish rapport with", and "to empathize or communicate sympathetically (with); also, to experience enjoyment". However, Heinlein's original concept, of a human who comes to Earth in early adulthood after being born on the planet Mars, is far more nuanced.

The concept of grok has garnered significant critical scrutiny in the years after the book's initial publication. Critic Istvan Csicsery-Ronay Jr. observed in 2008 that "the book's major theme can be seen as an extended definition of the term". The term and aspects of the underlying concept of the word also have become part of communities such as computer science.

== Etymology ==
Robert A. Heinlein coined the term grok in his 1961 novel Stranger in a Strange Land as a Martian word that could not be defined in Earthling terms but can be associated with various literal meanings such as "water", "to drink", "to relate", "life", or "to live", and that it had a much more profound figurative meaning that is difficult for terrestrial culture to understand because of the culture's assumption of a singular reality.

According to the book, drinking water is a central focus on Mars, where it is scarce. Martians use the merging of their bodies with water as a simple example or symbol of how two entities can combine to create a new reality greater than the sum of its parts. The water becomes part of the drinker and the drinker part of the water. Both grok each other. Things that once had separate realities become entangled in the same experiences, goals, history, and purpose. Within the book, the statement of divine immanence verbalized among the main characters, "thou art God", is logically derived from the concept inherent in the term grok.

Heinlein describes Martian words as "guttural" and "jarring". Martian speech is described as sounding "like a bullfrog fighting a cat". Accordingly, grok is generally pronounced as a guttural gr terminated by a sharp k with very little or no vowel sound (a narrow IPA transcription might be [ɡɹ̩kʰ]).

William Tenn suggests that when creating the word, Heinlein might have been influenced by his similar concept of griggo, which was introduced in his 1949 short story "Venus and the Seven Sexes". In his later afterword to the story, Tenn says Heinlein considered such influence "very possible".

== Definitions ==
Critic David E. Wright Sr. points out that in the 1991 "uncut" edition of Stranger in a Strange Land, the word grok "was used first without any explicit definition on page 22" and continued to be used without being explicitly defined until page 253 (emphasis in original). Characterizing the use on page 253 as Heinlein's first "intentional definition" of the word as simply, "to drink", Wright interprets that this defined use of the word is only as a metaphor, "much as English 'I see' often means the same as 'I understand'". Critics have bridged this absence of explicit definition by citing passages from the book that they believe illustrate various meanings of the term. A selection of these passages follows:

Grok means "to understand", of course, but Dr. Mahmoud, who might be termed the leading Terran expert on Martians, explains that it also means, "to drink" and "a hundred other English words, words which we think of as antithetical concepts. 'Grok' means all of these. It means 'fear', it means 'love', it means 'hate' — proper hate, for by the Martian 'map' you cannot hate anything unless you grok it, understand it so thoroughly that you merge with it and it merges with you — then you can hate it. By hating yourself. But this implies that you love it, too, and cherish it and would not have it otherwise. Then you can hate — and (I think) Martian hate is an emotion so black that the nearest human equivalent could only be called mild distaste."

The Martian Race had encountered the people of the fifth planet, grokked them completely, and had taken action; asteroid ruins were all that remained, save that the Martians continued to praise and cherish the people they had destroyed.

Grok means "identically equal". The human cliché "This hurts me more than it does you" has a distinctly Martian flavor. The Martian seems to know instinctively what we learned painfully from modern physics, that observer acts with observed through the process of observation. Grok means to understand so thoroughly that the observer becomes a part of the observed — to merge, blend, intermarry, lose identity in group experience. It means almost everything that we mean by philosophy, religion, and science and it means as little to us as color does to a blind man.

All that groks is God.

== Adoption and modern use ==
=== In computer programmer culture ===
Uses of the word in the decades after the 1960s are more concentrated in computer culture, such as an InfoWorld columnist in 1984 imagining a computer saying, "There isn't any software! Only different internal states of hardware. It's all hardware! It's a shame programmers don't grok that better."

The Jargon File, which describes itself as "The Hacker's Dictionary" and has been published under that name three times, puts grok in a programming context:

When you claim to "grok" some knowledge or technique, you are asserting that you have not merely learned it in a detached instrumental way but that it has become part of you, part of your identity. For example, to say that you "know" Lisp is simply to assert that you can code in it if necessary – but to say you "grok" Lisp is to claim that you have deeply entered the world-view and spirit of the language, with the implication that it has transformed your view of programming. Contrast zen, which is a similar supernatural understanding experienced as a single brief flash.

The entry existed in the very earliest forms of the Jargon File in the early 1980s.

The 2005 book Perl Best Practices defines grok as understanding a portion of computer code in a 'profound way'. It goes on to suggest that to re-grok code is to reload the intricacies of that portion of code into one's memory after some time has passed and all the details of it are no longer remembered. In that sense, to grok means to load everything into memory for immediate use. It is analogous to the way a processor caches memory for short term use, but the only implication by this reference was that it was something a human (or perhaps a Martian) would do.

==== Examples of computer culture use ====
A typical tech use from the Linux Bible characterizes the Unix software development philosophy as "one that can make your life a lot simpler once you grok the idea".

The 1994 book, Cyberia, covers its use in this subculture extensively:

This is all latter day usage, the original derivation was from an early text processing utility from so long ago that no one remembers but, grok was the output when it understood the file. K&R would remember.

- The main web page for cURL, an open source tool and programming library, describes the function of cURL as "cURL groks URLs".
- The keystroke logging software used by the NSA for its remote intelligence gathering operations is named GROK.
- One of the most powerful parsing filters used in Elasticsearch software's logstash component is named grok.
- A reference book by Carey Bunks on the use of the GNU Image Manipulation Program is entitled Grokking the GIMP.
- The generative artificial intelligence chatbot developed by SpaceXAI is named Grok.

=== Counterculture uses ===
- Tom Wolfe, in his 1968 book The Electric Kool-Aid Acid Test, describes a character's thoughts during an acid trip: "He looks down, two bare legs, a torso rising up at him and like he is just noticing them for the first time ... he has never seen any of this flesh before, this stranger. He groks over that ..."
- In his counterculture Volkswagen repair manual, How to Keep Your Volkswagen Alive: A Manual of Step-by-Step Procedures for the Compleat Idiot (1969), dropout aerospace engineer John Muir instructs prospective used VW buyers to "grok the car" before buying.
- The word was used numerous times by Robert Anton Wilson in his works The Illuminatus! Trilogy and Schrödinger's Cat Trilogy. For instance, in The Eye in the Pyramid, volume one of Illuminatus:

I caught the references to Aristotle, the old man of the tribe with his unfortunate epistemological paresis, and also to that feisty little lady I always imagine is really the lost Anastasia, but I still didn’t grok. “What do you mean?” I asked (...)

- And in The Trick Top Hat, volume two of Schrödinger's Cat Trilogy by Wilson:

Williams went on. "You've got to think of time ripples, as well as space ripples, to grok the quantum world..."

== See also ==
- (in German) Anschauung – related "sense-perception" concept in Kantian philosophy
- Appropriation (sociology) – Assimilation of concepts into a governing framework
- Being-in-the-world – a term in the existentialist philosophy of Martin Heidegger, aimed at deconstructing the subject–object distinction
- Grokking (machine learning) – a transition to generalization that occurs many training iterations after the interpolation threshold, after many iterations of seemingly little progress
- Introjection vs assimilation in Fritz and Laura Perls' gestalt therapy – analogous to memorizing vs grokking
- Knowledge by acquaintance and knowledge by description – a distinction in philosophy between familiarity with a person, place, or thing and knowledge of facts
- Logos – a term in Western philosophy that has been used to describe various forms of knowledge and reasoning
- Phenomenology (psychology) – the study of subjective experience
- Qi – Vital force in traditional Chinese philosophy
