= NTK =

NTK may refer to:

- Naam Tamilar Katchi, political party in Tamil Nadu, India
- Národní technická knihovna, library in Prague, Czech Republic
- Need to Know (newsletter)
- Newton Toolkit, for the Newton (platform) PDA
- Ngau Tau Kok station, Hong Kong, MTR station code
- Neural tangent kernel, a mathematical tool to describe the training of artificial neural networks
- NTK, a Niterra brand of ceramic sensors and equipment
