= Generalization (disambiguation) =

Generalization is the formulation of a general concept from specific instances.

Generalization may also refer to:

- Generalization (learning), a concept in learning theory
- Faulty generalization, an informal fallacy
- Universal generalization, a rule in predicate logic

== See also ==
- Genericization, a process where a trademark becomes a generic trademark
