= Appropriation of knowledge =

Educational psychology concept

Appropriation of knowledge is the process of constructing knowledge from social and cultural sources, and integrating it into pre-existing schemas. It is a developmental process that comes about through socially formulated, goal-directed, and tool-mediated actions. Appropriation draws on the developmental theories of Piaget and Vygotsky, as both the cognitive and social-constructivist views of learning are equally emphasized. Henry Jenkins discusses appropriation as "the ability to meaningfully sample and remix the content(s)" of our culture for new expressive purposes. Jenkins noted that many literature classes in schools are embracing appropriation. A common example of appropriation at its finest is Ricardo Pitts-Wiley's "Moby-Dick: Then and Now", a contemporary reworking of Herman Melville's Moby-Dick narrative. Fundamental to appropriation is the idea that knowledge is socially constructed and that the student plays an active role in its construction. Appropriation has occurred when the student has adapted the information in a way that is meaningful to them and they can use the knowledge as their own.

== Activity theory ==
Appropriation in education is often understood and analyzed through activity theory. This theory was developed by Aleksei N. Leontiev and focuses on understanding the socio-cultural context (specifically the setting) learning occurs in. Activity theory is predicated on the assumption that a person's frameworks for thinking are developed and carried out in specific settings, and that these settings mediate cognitive development. Since appropriation also places a strong emphasis on setting, these theories complement each other when being used to analyze learning environments.

== Process of appropriating knowledge ==
Hung has developed steps through which the appropriation of knowledge usually occurs. The process is as follows:

1. Growing into dependency (submitting)
the student recognizes the differences between their beliefs/knowledge and the beliefs/knowledge of the teacher. The student accepts the teacher as the leader and submits to their beliefs, knowledge and rules.
2. Dependency (mirroring)
The student adapts strategies to help submit to the beliefs, knowledge and rules of the teacher. The student questions the teacher and other students and begins to co-construct and negotiate meanings.
3. Growing out of dependency (constructing)
the student experiments with the beliefs, knowledge and rules co-constructed with the teacher and other students and uses these ideas outside of the classroom. The student discovers patterns, ideas, concepts and beliefs inherent to the learning community and applies them to other environments.

== Five degrees of appropriation ==
Through research with English teachers, Grossman et al. developed a theory to describe the varying levels of appropriation. The degrees

Lack of appropriation
the student has not appropriated the knowledge. This may occur because the concept being taught is too difficult for the student to comprehend or is too foreign to fit into the learner’s prior frameworks at that point in their development.
Appropriating a label
the student knows the name of the concept but knows none of the features.
Appropriating surface features
the student knows most of the features of the concept, but does not understand how those features contribute to the conceptual whole.
Appropriating conceptual underpinnings
the student grasps the theoretical basis that informs and motivates the use of the concept and is able to make use of the concept in new contexts and for solving new problems. This is the level of appropriation that teachers and students should strive for.
Achieving mastery
the student has the skills to use the concept effectively and to its fullest effect. This should also be strived for, but would likely to years of practice to achieve.

=== Factors affecting the degree of appropriation ===
There are a variety of factors that can affect the level of appropriation that the student achieves. Some of these factors are:

- The role the student plays in the learning process: students that play an active role in their learning process are more likely to appropriate knowledge.
- The social context of learning: this refers to the environment where the student learning, the values and expectations implied in the learning environment, how the knowledge is introduced by the teacher, and the social practices that occur in the learning environment. A more positive learning environment will most likely result in higher degrees of appropriation.
- Individual characteristics of the student: this includes the beliefs, goals, expectations, and motives of the student. The closer a student’s values align with those of the teacher, the more likely a student will appropriate the knowledge. A student’s motives also affect the degree of appropriation. Students who are intrinsically motivated are more likely to reach a higher level of appropriation.
- Interest and knowledge of the teacher: a teacher who appears more interested and/ or knowledgeable in the content being taught is more likely to influence appropriation in their students.

== Outcomes of appropriation ==
Through appropriation students construct their own versions of knowledge, allowing internalization of the information they have learned. Their beliefs and behaviours concerning the concepts learned also change. These transformations alter the student’s conception of the information, which will affect how that information is given to others interacting with the student. How knowledge is transferred from one person to the next is an important aspect of appropriation and demonstrates the collaborative aspect of appropriation, where knowledge is constantly being negotiated with other. Collaboratively, students and teachers construct knowledge in a way that is meaningful to them.

== See also ==
- Appropriation (sociology)
- Grok
