= Appropriation (sociology) =

Assimilation of concepts into a governing framework

In sociology, appropriation refers to the process by which individuals or groups adopt and incorporate elements—such as ideas, practices, symbols, or cultural products—into their own social or conceptual frameworks. This process often involves reshaping or reinterpreting these elements in ways that align with the adopter’s values, worldview, or identity. Appropriation can be part of cultural assimilation, intellectual integration, or the formation of collective understanding. In some contexts, it is viewed as a neutral or constructive act, while in others—especially where power imbalances exist—it may be criticized as misappropriation, particularly when it involves the unacknowledged or exploitative use of marginalized cultures or knowledge systems.

== Theoretical perspectives ==
Scholar James J. Sosnoski describes appropriation as "the assimilation of concepts into a governing framework... the arrogation, confiscation, [or] seizure of concepts."

Tracy B. Strong emphasizes the Latin root proprius, linking appropriation to ideas of property, propriety, and ownership. He writes, "I have appropriated something when I have made it mine... A text is successfully appropriated insofar as the appropriator no longer is troubled with it..."

Gloria Anzaldúa distinguishes appropriation from proliferation, writing that "the difference between appropriation [misappropriation] and proliferation is that the first steals and harms; the second helps heal breaches of knowledge."

== See also ==
- Appropriation of knowledge
- Appropriation (art)
- Cultural appropriation
- Grok
- Reappropriation

== Sources ==
- Thomas, Calvin, ed. (2000). "Introduction: Identification, Appropriation, Proliferation", Straight with a Twist: Queer Theory and the Subject of Heterosexuality. University of Illinois Press. ISBN 0-252-06813-0.
  - Sosnoski, James J. (1993). "A Mindless Man-Driven Theory Machine: Intellectuality, Sexuality, and the Institution of Criticism", Feminisms: An Anthology of Literary Theory and Criticism, p. 50. Eds. Robyn Warhol and Diane L. Herndl. New Brunswick, N.J.: Rutgers University Press.
  - Strong, Tracy B. (1996). "Nietzsche's Political Misappropriation", The Cambridge Companion to Nietzsche, p. 125. Eds. Bernd Magnus and Kathleen M. Higgins. Cambridge: Cambridge University Press.
  - Anzaldúa, Gloria (1990). "Haciendo cara, una entrada", Making Face, Making Soul/Haciendo Caras: Creative and Critical Perspectives by Feminists of Color, p.xxi. Ed. Gloria Anzaldúa. San Francisco: Aunt Lute Books.
- Middleton, Richard (1990/2002). Studying Popular Music. Philadelphia: Open University Press. ISBN 0-335-15275-9.
  - Maróthy (1981).
  - Stefani (1987).
