= Robyn R. Warhol =

Robyn R. Warhol (born 1955) is an American literary scholar, associated in particular with feminist narrative theory, of which she is considered (along with Susan Sniader Lanser) one of the originators. She is currently an Arts and Humanities Distinguished Professor of English at the Ohio State University and a core faculty member of Project Narrative. Warhol received her BA in English from Pomona College in 1977 and her PhD in English and American Literature from Stanford University in 1982, where she studied with Thomas Moser, George Dekker, and Ian Watt.

Her approach uses the vocabulary developed within narrative theory to describe how novels are put together, keeping in mind the differences that gender can make in how stories are written and read. Her first book introduced the idea that narrators in nineteenth-century realist novels could use "masculine" or "feminine" styles of storytelling, whether the authors were women or men. Warhol called the feminine style "the engaging narrator," a narrator that earnestly speaks directly to "you, Reader." Having a Good Cry looks at how repeated reading or watching of popular narrative forms like soap opera, serialized novels, and chick-flicks shapes individual people's gender identity. The book is unusual in its focus on bodily feelings that audiences may experience like crying, cringing, or yawning while reading.

== Biography ==
Warhol was born in 1955 and has lived in Kansas, Minnesota, New Mexico, Nevada, California, Vermont and Ohio. At Stanford her dissertation directors were Thomas Moser, George Dekker, and Ian Watt. Courses with Susan Morgan, Donald Davie, and Jay Fliegelman also influenced her later work. In 1986-87 Warhol spent a year at Harvard University as a Mellon Faculty Fellow. She has been a visiting faculty member at Brandeis University, Rice University, and the University of Southern California, and was a 2011-2012 Senior Fellow at the Freiburg Institute for Advanced Study in Germany.

Before joining the faculty at the Ohio State University in 2009, Warhol served, at various points, as Chair of the English Department, Director of Women's Studies, Director of the Humanities Center, and President of the Faculty Senate at the University of Vermont, where she was a professor from 1983 to 2009.

Warhol is the author of Having a Good Cry: Effeminate Feelings and Popular Forms (Ohio State UP, 2003) and Gendered Interventions: Narrative Discourse in the Victorian Novel (Rutgers UP, 1989). Now out of print, Gendered Interventions is now available for free on the Ohio State University Press website. With Diane Price Herndl, Warhol is co-editor of Feminisms: An Anthology of Literary Theory and Criticism (Rutgers UP, 1991 and 1997), and an updated, condensed version of that anthology called Feminisms Redux (Rutgers UP, 2009). A book Warhol co-authored with David Herman, James Phelan, Peter Rabinowitz, and Brian Richardson, Narrative Theory: Core Concepts and Critical Debates was published by the Ohio State UP in 2011. Warhol has also published articles on narrative theory, feminist theory, nineteenth-century British and American authors, and contemporary U.S. popular culture in a wide range of journals, including PMLA, Narrative, Modern Fiction Studies, Style, Genders, Victorian Studies, College Literature, Dickens Studies Annual, and The Henry James Review.

Between 2007 and 2010 Warhol published under the name "Robyn Warhol-Down."

== Selected works ==
=== Books and editions ===
- Gendered Interventions: Narrative Discourse in the Victorian Novel. Rutgers University Press, 1989.
- Feminisms. Co-edited with Diane Price Herndl. Rutgers University Press, 1991, 1997.
- Having a Good Cry: Effeminate Feelings and Popular Forms. The Ohio State University Press, 2003.
- Women’s Worlds: The McGraw-Hill Anthology of Women’s Writing in English. Editor-in-chief. 2008.
- Feminisms Redux. Co-edited with Diane Price Herndl. Rutgers University Press, 2009.
- Narrative Theory: Core Concepts and Critical Debates. With David Herman, James Phelan, Peter Rabinowitz, and Brian Richardson. The Ohio State University Press, 2011.
- "Narrative Theory Unbound: Queer and Feminist Interventions." Co-edited with Susan S. Lanser. The Ohio State University Press, 2015.
- "Love Among the Archives: Writing the Lives of George Scharf, Victorian Bachelor". With Helena Michie. Edinburgh University Press, 2015.

=== Recent articles ===
- Warhol, Robyn R. (2008), "Neonarrative; or, how to render the unnarratable in realist fiction and contemporary film", in Phelan, James; Rabinowitz, Peter J. (eds.), A companion to narrative theory, Malden, Massachusetts Oxford: Blackwell, pp. 220–231, ISBN 9781405184380.
- Warhol, Robyn R. (Fall 2007). "Narrative refusals and generic transformation in Austen and James: what doesn't happen in Northanger Abbey and The Spoils of Poynton". The Henry James Review. 28 (3): 259–268. doi:10.1353/hjr.2007.0026. S2CID 191495381.
- Warhol-Down, Robyn (June 2008). "Jasmine reconsidered: narrative discourse and multicultural subjectivity". Contemporary Women's Writing. 2 (1): 1–16. doi:10.1093/cww/vpn007.
- Warhol, Robyn R. (2008). "Academics anonymous: a meditation on anonymity, power, and powerlessness". Symplokē. 16 (1–2): 51–59. doi:10.1353/sym.0.0056. S2CID 143462703.
- Herman, David; McHale, Brian; Phelan, James (2010). Teaching narrative theory. New York: Modern Language Association of America. ISBN 9781603290814.
- Warhol, Robyn R. (June 2010). ""What might have been is not what is": Dicken's narrative refusals". Dickens Studies Annual. 41: 45–59. doi:10.7756/dsa.041.003.45-59.
- Warhol-Down, Robyn; Michie, Helena (Spring 2010). "Adventures in the archives: two literary critics in pursuit of a Victorian subject". Victorian Studies. 52 (3): 413–439. doi:10.2979/VIC.2010.52.3.413. S2CID 143658735.
- Warhol, Robyn (Summer 2011). "The space between: a narrative approach to Alison Bechdel's Fun Home". College Literature. 38 (3): 1–20. doi:10.1353/lit.2011.0025. S2CID 143891783.
- Warhol, Robyn (2014). "Binge Watching: How Netflix Original Programs Are Changing Serial Form". Literatur in Wissenschaft und Unterricht. 47 (1/2). Kiel University, Germany: 145–158.
- Warhol, Robyn (Winter 2014). "Describing the Unseen: The Visceral and Virtual Construction of Spaces in "Bleak House"". Style. 48 (4): 629–636. doi:10.5325/style.48.4.612. JSTOR 10.5325/style.48.4.612.
