= Generalization (learning) =

Concept on humans' and animals' use of past learning in present situations

Generalization is the concept that humans, other animals, and artificial neural networks use past learning in present situations of learning if the conditions in the situations are regarded as similar. The learner uses generalized patterns, principles, and other similarities between past experiences and novel experiences to more efficiently navigate the world. For example, if a person has learned in the past that every time they eat an apple, their throat becomes itchy and swollen, they might assume they are allergic to all fruit. When this person is offered a banana to eat, they reject it upon assuming they are also allergic to it through generalizing that all fruits cause the same reaction. Although this generalization about being allergic to all fruit based on experiences with one fruit could be correct in some cases, it may not be correct in all. Both positive and negative effects have been shown in education through learned generalization and its contrasting notion of discrimination learning.

== Overview ==
Generalization is understood to be directly tied to the transfer of knowledge across multiple situations. The knowledge to be transferred is often referred to as abstractions, because the learner abstracts a rule or pattern of characteristics from previous experiences with similar stimuli. Generalization allows humans and animals to recognize the similarities in knowledge acquired in one circumstance, allowing for transfer of knowledge onto new situations. This idea rivals the theory of situated cognition, instead stating that one can apply past knowledge to learning in new situations and environments.

Generalization can be supported and partly explained by the connectionism approach. Just as artificial intelligences learn to distinguish between different categories by applying past learning to novel situations, humans and animals generalize previously learned properties and patterns onto new situations, thus connecting the novel experience to past experiences that are similar in one or more ways. This creates a pattern of connections that allows the learner to classify and make assumptions about the novel stimulus, such as when previous experience with seeing a canary allows the learner to predict what other birds will be like. This categorization is a foundational aspect of generalizing.

== Research on generalization ==
In scientific studies looking at generalization, a generalization gradient is often used. This tool is used to measure how often and how much animals or humans respond to certain stimuli, depending on whether the stimuli are perceived to be similar or different. The curvilinear shape of the gradient is achieved by placing the perceived similarity of a stimulus on the x-axis and the strength of the response on the y-axis. For example, when measuring responses to color, it is expected that subjects will respond to colors that are similar to each other, like shades of pink after being exposed to red, as opposed to a non-similar shade of blue. The gradient is relatively predictable, with the response to similar stimuli being slightly less strong than the response to the conditioned stimulus, then steadily declining as the presented stimuli become increasingly dissimilar.

Several studies have suggested that generalization is a fundamental and naturally occurring learning process for humans. Nine-month-old infants require very few (sometimes only 3) experiences with a category before learning to generalize. In fact, infants generalize so well during early stages of development (such as learning to recognize specific sounds as language) that it can be hard for them to discriminate between variations of the generalized stimuli at later stages of development (such as failing to distinguish between the subtly different sounds of similar phonemes). One potential explanation for why children are such efficient learners is that they operate in accordance with the goal of making their world more predictable, therefore encouraging them to hold strongly to generalizations that effectively help them to navigate their environment.

Some evidence suggests that children are born with innate processes for accurately generalizing things. For example, children tend to generalize based on taxonomic rather than thematic similarities (an experience with one ball leads to the child identifying other ball-shaped objects as “ball” rather than labeling a bat as “ball” because a bat is used to hit a ball).

Wakefield, Hall, James, and Goldin (2018) found that children are more flexible in generalizing new verbs when they are taught the verb by observing gestures as opposed to being taught by performing the action themselves. When helping a child learn a new word, providing more examples of the word increases the child's capacity to generalize the word to different contexts and situations. Furthermore, writing interventions for grade-school students yield better results when the intervention actively targets generalization as an outcome.

Generalization has been shown to be refined and/or stabilized after sleep.

== Implications ==
Without the ability to generalize, it would likely be very difficult to navigate the world in a useful way. For example, generalization is an important part of how humans learn to trust unfamiliar people and a necessary element in language acquisition.

For a person who lacked the capacity to generalize from one experience to the next, every instance of a dog would be completely separated from other instances of dogs, so prior experience would do nothing to help the person know how to interact with this seemingly new stimulus. In fact, even if the person experienced the very same dog multiple times, he or she would have no way of knowing what to expect and each instance would be as if the individual were encountering a dog for the first time. Therefore, generalization is a valuable and integral part of learning and everyday life.

Generalization is shown to have implications on the use of the spacing effect in educational settings. In the past, it was thought that the information forgotten between periods of learning when implementing spaced presentation inhibited generalization. In more recent years, this forgetting has been seen as promoting generalization through repetition of information during each occasion of spaced learning. The effects of gaining long-term generalization knowledge through spaced learning can be compared with that of massed learning (lengthy and all at once; for example, cramming the night before an exam) in which a person only gains short-term knowledge, decreasing the likelihood of establishing generalization.

Generalization is also considered to be an important factor in procedural memory, such as the near-automatic memory processes necessary for driving a car. Without being able to generalize from previous experiences driving, a person would essentially need to relearn how to drive every time he or she encountered a new street. People who are diagnosed with NVLD - non verbal learning disorder - are known to sometimes have difficulty applying learned concept to new situations.

Not all of generalization's effects are beneficial, however. An important part of learning is knowing when not to generalize, which is called discrimination learning. Were it not for discrimination learning, humans and animals would struggle to respond correctly to different situations. For example, a dog may be trained to come to its owner when it hears a whistle. If the dog generalizes this training, it may not discriminate between the sound of the whistle and other stimuli, so it would come running to its owner when it hears any high-pitched noise.

== Fear generalization ==
A specific type of generalization, fear generalization, occurs when a person associates fears learned in the past through classical conditioning to similar situations, events, people, and objects in their present. This is important for the survival of the organism; humans and animals need to be able to assess aversive situations and respond appropriately based on generalizations made from past experiences.

When fear generalization becomes maladaptive it is connected to many anxiety disorders. This maladaptation is often referred to as the overgeneralization of fear and can also lead to the development of posttraumatic stress disorder. Overgeneralization is hypothetically attributed to “dysregulation of prefrontal-amygdalo-hippocampal circuitry” (Banich, et al., 2010, p. 21).

One of the earliest studies about fear generalization in humans was conducted by Watson and Raynor (1920): the Little Albert experiment. In their study, an infant known as Little Albert was exposed to various visual stimuli, including several kinds of animals, none of which elicited a fear response from Little Albert. However, after 7 pairings of a white laboratory rat and the sound of a hammer clanging against a steel bar (which elicited a fear response), the 11-month old child began to cry and try to get away from the white rat even without the loud noise. Months later, additional trials showed that Little Albert had generalized his fear response to things that were similar to the white rat, including a dog, a rabbit, and a fur coat.

Brain regions involved in fear generalization include the amygdala and the hippocampus. The hippocampus seems to be more involved in the development of context fear generalization (developing a generalized fear for a specific environment) than stimulus fear generalization (such as Little Albert's acquisition of a fear response to white, furry objects). The amygdala, which is associated with all types of emotional responses, is fundamental in developing a classically conditioned fear response to either a stimulus or the context in which it is found.

== Generalization in machine learning ==
Characterizing the generalization of various learning algorithms is an active topic of current research, especially for deep learning algorithms.

== See also ==
- Chunking (psychology)
