= Logistic model tree =

In computer science, a logistic model tree (LMT) is a classification model with an associated supervised training algorithm that combines logistic regression (LR) and decision tree learning.

Logistic model trees are based on the earlier idea of a model tree: a decision tree that has linear regression models at its leaves to provide a piecewise linear regression model (where ordinary decision trees with constants at their leaves would produce a piecewise constant model). In the logistic variant, the LogitBoost algorithm is used to produce an LR model at every node in the tree; the node is then split using the C4.5 criterion. Each LogitBoost invocation is warm-started from its results in the parent node. Finally, the tree is pruned.

The basic LMT induction algorithm uses cross-validation to find a number of LogitBoost iterations that does not overfit the training data. A faster version has been proposed that uses the Akaike information criterion to control LogitBoost stopping.

== See also ==
- C4.5 algorithm
