= Michael J. Flynn =

American academic (1934–2025)

Michael Flynn
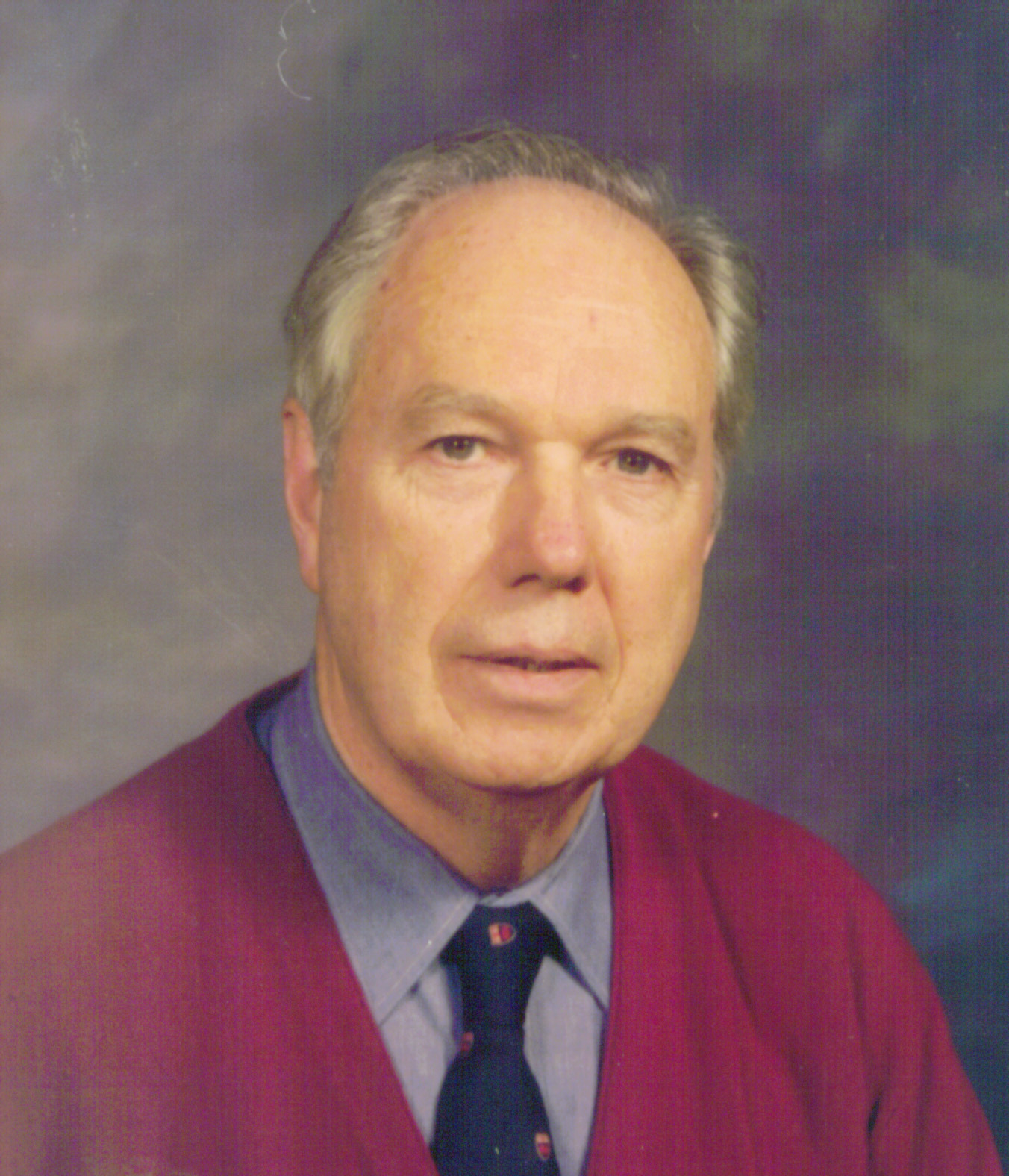
- Born: May 20, 1934; New York City, U.S.
- Died: December 24, 2025 (aged 91)
- Education: Manhattan College; Syracuse University; Purdue University
- Known for: Flynn's taxonomy
- Awards: Harry H. Goode Memorial Award; IEEE Computer Society Charles Babbage Award
- Scientific career
- Workplaces: Stanford University
- Doctoral students: Philip S. Yu

Michael John Flynn (May 20, 1934 – December 24, 2025) was an American professor emeritus at Stanford University.

== Early life and education ==
Flynn was born in Jamaica, New York, the son of Martin and Anne Flynn. He attended and graduated from Bishop Loughlin Memorial High School. After graduating, he attended Manhattan University, earning his bachelor's degree in 1955. He also attended Syracuse University, earning his master's degree in 1960, and his PhD degree in 1961 at Purdue University.

== Career ==
Flynn proposed Flynn's taxonomy, a method of classifying parallel digital computers, in 1966.

In the early 1970s, he was the founding chairman of IEEE Computer Society's Technical Committee on Computer Architecture (TCCA) and Association for Computing Machinery's Special Interest Group on Computer Architecture, ACM SIGARCH (initially SICARCH). Flynn encouraged, from the beginning, joint cooperation between the two groups which now sponsors many leading joint symposiums and conferences like ACM/IEEE International Symposium on Computer Architecture (ISCA).

In 1995 he received a Harry H. Goode Memorial Award.

In 2009, Flynn received an honorary doctorate from the University of Belgrade.

Flynn co-founded Palyn Associates with Maxwell Paley and in 2014 is Chairman of Maxeler Technologies.

Flynn died on December 24, 2025, at the age of 91.

== Bibliography ==
- Flynn, Michael J. (1995). Computer architecture: pipelined and parallel processor design. Boston, MA: Jones and Bartlett. ISBN 0-86720-204-1.
- Flynn, Michael J. (2001). Advanced Computer Arithmetic Design. New York, NY: Wiley. ISBN 0-471-41209-0.
