= Philip S. Yu =

Taiwanese-American computer scientist

- Born: 1952 (age 73–74)
- Education: National Taiwan University (BS); Stanford University (MS, PhD); New York University (MBA)
- Scientific career
- Fields: Computer science Information science
- Institutions: University of Illinois at Chicago
- Thesis: Stochastic Modeling of Computer Systems and Networks (1978)
- Doctoral advisor: Michael J. Flynn

Philip S. Yu (born c. 1952) is a Taiwanese-American computer scientist. He is the Wexler Chair Professor of Information Technology at the University of Illinois at Chicago. He holds over 300 patents, and is known for his work in the field of data mining.

== Early life and education ==
Yu graduated from National Taiwan University with a Bachelor of Science (B.S.) in electrical engineering. He then earned a Master of Science (M.S.) in 1976 and his Ph.D. in 1978, both from Stanford University in electrical engineering and computer science. In 1982, he earned an M.B.A. from New York University at the Stern School of Business.

== Career ==
Yu started his career in private enterprise, at IBM's Thomas J. Watson Research Center, where he eventually became manager of the Software Tools and Techniques group. Currently he is Distinguished Professor and Wexler Chair in Information Technology at the Department of Computer Science of the University of Illinois at Chicago

Yu holds over 300 U.S. patents, is an ACM and IEEE Fellow, is editor-in-chief of ACM Transactions on Knowledge Discovery from Data, has chaired numerous conferences, and received several awards, including from IBM, the IEEE and, in 2022, he and his coauthors, Yizhou Sun, Jiawei Han, Xifeng Yan, and Tianyi Wu, received the Very Large Data Bases Endowment Inc. (VLDB) 2022 Test of Time award, for their 2011 research paper, PathSim: Meta Path-Based Top-K Similarity Search in Heterogeneous Information Networks.

His research interests are in the fields of "data mining (especially on graph/network mining), social network, privacy preserving data publishing, data stream, database systems, and Internet applications and technologies." Yu is an ISI Highly Cited researcher. According to Google Scholar, Yu's H-index is among the ten highest in computer science.

== Selected works ==
Yu has authored or co-authored several books and over 650 academic articles, including:

- Zhang, Jiawei, Philip S. Yu. Broad Learning Through Fusions: An Application on Social Networks, Springer, 2019
- Park, Jong Soo, Ming Syan Chen, and Philip S. Yu. An effective hash-based algorithm for mining association rules. Vol. 24. No. 2. ACM, 1995.
- Chen, Ming-Syan, Jiawei Han, and Philip S. Yu. "Data mining: an overview from a database perspective." Knowledge and data Engineering, IEEE Transactions on 8.6 (1996): 866–883.
- Aggarwal, Charu C., et al. "Fast algorithms for projected clustering." ACM SIGMOD Record. Vol. 28. No. 2. ACM, 1999.
- Aggarwal, Charu C., et al. "A framework for clustering evolving data streams." Proceedings of the 29th international conference on Very large data bases-Volume 29. VLDB Endowment, 2003.
- Wang, Haixun, et al. "Mining concept-drifting data streams using ensemble classifiers." Proceedings of the ninth ACM SIGKDD international conference on Knowledge discovery and data mining. ACM, 2003.
- Ross Quinlan, Qiang Yang, Zhou Zhihua and David Hand et al. Top 10 algorithms in data mining. Knowledge and Information Systems 14.1: 1-37. 2008
