= Decision mining =

Subtopic in process mining

Process mining is a technique used to turn event data into insights and actions. Techniques used in process mining such as Process discovery and Conformance checking depend only on the order of activities executed in the operations. The event log not only contains the activity details, but also timestamps, resources and data accompanied with process execution. Careful analysis of the external details from the event log can reveal useful information that can be used for making predictions on decisions that might be taken in the future (decision mining), efficiency and working dynamics of the team (organizational mining), and performance analysis.

Decision mining is a way of enhancing process models by analyzing the decision points in the model and finding the rules in those decision points based on data attributes. The rules for decision mining is extracted using decision tree algorithms, that analyses decision points to find out which properties of a case might lead to taking certain paths in the process.

== Example ==
If petri nets are considered as process models, a decision point corresponds to a place with multiple outgoing arcs. Such a place would be a point of decision from where only one of the transitions is executed.

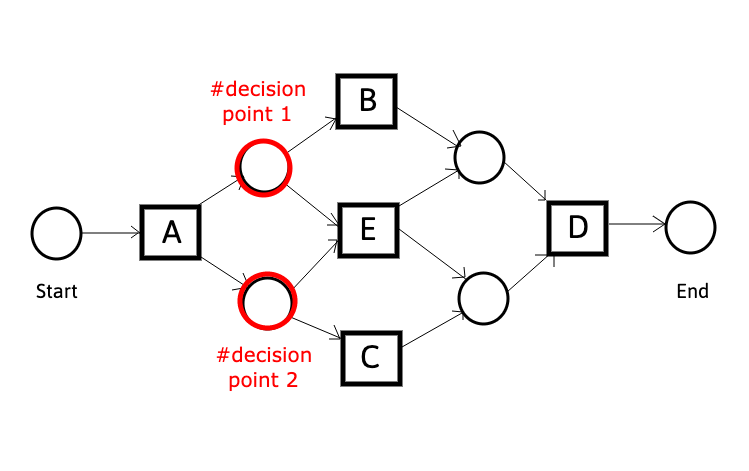

The existing event log attributes can be used to create decision trees based on the choice taken in these decision points. For such a decision tree, the independent attributes would contain the attributes recorded in the event log, and the dependent attribute would be the choice of transition made. Using this data a decision tree can be created for the prediction of the transition that might be executed in the future given a set of base conditions.

=== Creating guards for transitions ===
Once a decision tree is explored, each decision point can be annotated with guards. These guards are the conditions created using various data variables that help in choosing one of the transitions for execution from the decision point. The petri net enhanced with the guards can be used for making future predictions of the type of decisions made at the decision points.

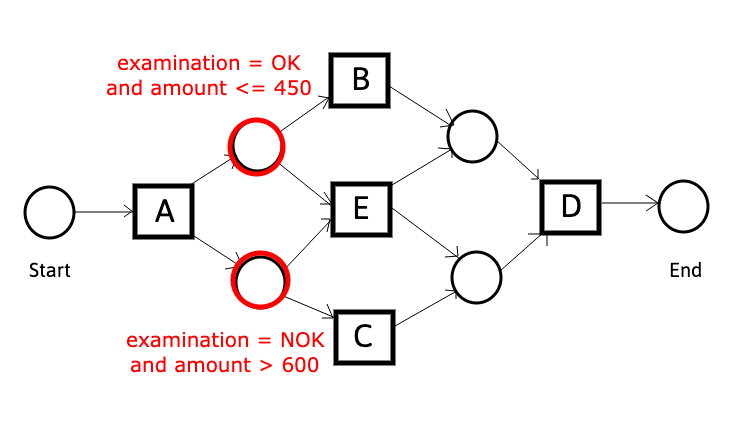

== Decision mining using ProM ==
The Decision Miner plug-in is built into ProM that determines the decision points contained in a Petri net model, and specifies the possible decisions with respect to the log while being able to deal with invisible and duplicate activities. The plugin requires a process model and an event log, and it produces an enhanced process model in return.

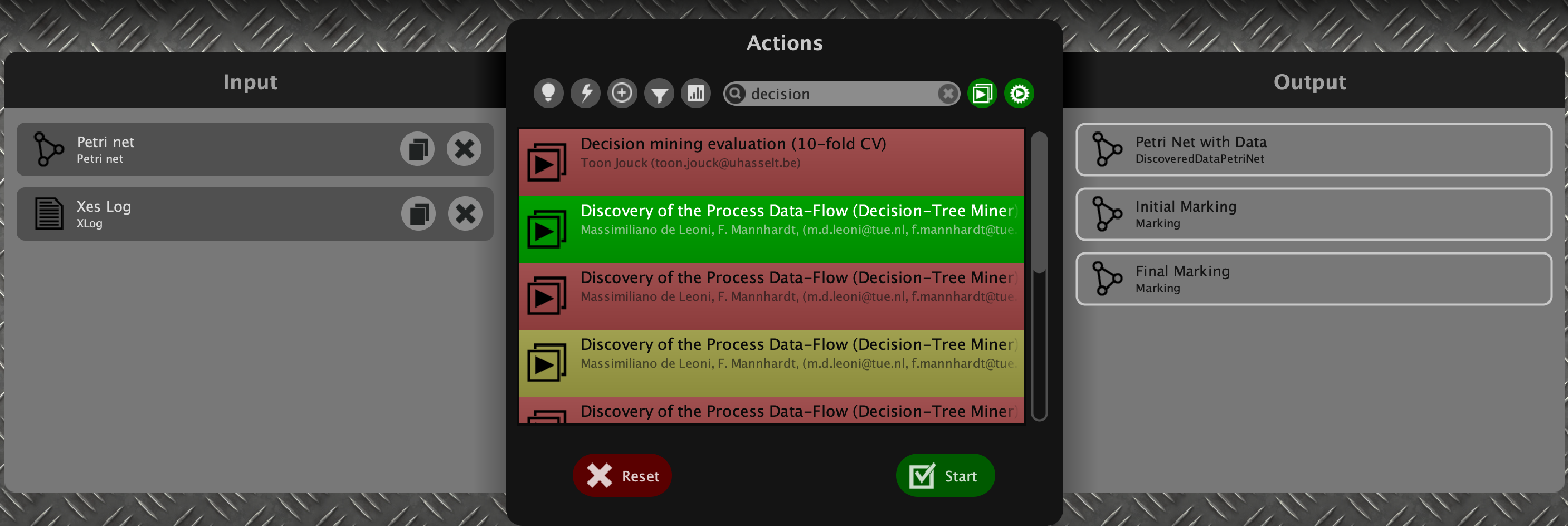
Decision mining ProM plugin

Decision Miner formulates the learning problem, the actual analysis is carried out with the help of the J48 decision tree classifier, which is the implementation of the C4.5 algorithm provided by the Weka software library. The Algorithm view offers the full range of parameters that are available for the used decision tree algorithm from the Weka library.

== Challenges ==
- The first challenge relates to the quality of data, and the correct interpretation of their semantics. For example, there might be a loss of data or incorrectly logged events, which is typically referred to as noise
- The second challenge relates to the correct interpretation of the control-flow semantics of a process model when it comes to classifying the decisions that have been made.
