= Ross Quinlan =

Computer scientist

- Born: John Ross Quinlan
- Education: University of Sydney (BSc, 1965); University of Washington (PhD, 1968)
- Known for: ID3; C4.5; C5.0; FOIL
- Awards: Founding Fellow of the Association for the Advancement of Artificial Intelligence
- Scientific career
- Fields: Computer science, data mining, decision theory, machine learning
- Workplaces: University of New South Wales; University of Sydney; University of Technology Sydney; RAND Corporation; RuleQuest Research
- Thesis: (1968)

John Ross Quinlan is a computer science researcher in data mining and decision theory. He has contributed extensively to the development of decision tree algorithms, including inventing the canonical C4.5 and ID3 algorithms. He also contributed to early ILP literature with First Order Inductive Learner (FOIL). He is currently running the company RuleQuest Research which he founded in 1997.

== Education ==
He received his BSc degree in Physics and Computing from the University of Sydney in 1965 and his computer science doctorate at the University of Washington in 1968. He has held positions at the University of New South Wales, University of Sydney, University of Technology Sydney, and RAND Corporation.

== Artificial intelligence ==
Quinlan is a specialist in artificial intelligence, particularly in the aspect involving machine learning and its application to data mining. He is a Founding Fellow of the Association for the Advancement of Artificial Intelligence.

=== ID3 ===
Ross Quinlan invented the Iterative Dichotomiser 3 (ID3) algorithm which is used to generate decision trees. ID3 follows the principle of Occam's razor in attempting to create the smallest decision tree possible.

=== C4.5 ===
He then expanded upon the principles used in ID3 to create C4.5.

C4.5 improved: discrete and continuous attributes, missing attribute values, attributes with differing costs, pruning trees (replacing irrelevant branches with leaf nodes).

=== C5.0 ===
C5.0, which Quinlan is commercially selling (single-threaded version is distributed under the terms of the GNU General Public License), is an improvement on C4.5. The advantages are speed (several orders of magnitude faster), memory efficiency, smaller decision trees, boosting (more accuracy), ability to weight different attributes, and winnowing (reducing noise).

== Selected works ==
=== Books ===
- 1993. C4.5: Programs for Machine Learning. Morgan Kaufmann Publishers. ISBN 1-55860-238-0.

=== Articles ===
- Quinlan, J. R. (1982) Semi-autonomous acquisition of pattern-based knowledge, In Machine intelligence 10 (eds J. E. Hayes, D. Michie, and Y.-H. Pao). Ellis Norwood, Chichester.
- Quinlan, J.R. (1985). Decision trees and multi-valued attributes, In J.E. Hayes & D. Michie (Eds.), Machine intelligence 11. Oxford University Press.
- Quinlan, J. R. (1986). Induction of decision trees. Machine Learning, 1(1):81-106
- 2008. (with Qiang Yang, Philip S. Yu, Zhou Zhihua, and David Hand et al). Top 10 algorithms in data mining. Knowledge and Information Systems 14.1: 1-37
- Quinlan, J. R. (1990). Learning logical definitions from relations. Machine Learning, 5:239-266.

== See also ==
- ID3 algorithm
- C4.5 algorithm
- Data mining
- Inductive Logic Programming
