= Expected value (disambiguation) =

Expected value is a term used in probability theory and statistics. It may also refer to:

== Physics ==
- Expectation value (quantum mechanics), the probabilistic expected value of the result (measurement) of an experiment

== Decision theory and quantitative policy analysis ==
- Expected value of perfect information, the price that one would be willing to pay in order to gain access to perfect information
- Expected value of sample information, the expected increase in utility that a decision-maker could obtain from gaining access to a sample of additional observations before making a decision
- Expected value of including uncertainty, the expected difference in the value of a decision based on a probabilistic analysis versus a decision based on an analysis that ignores uncertainty

== Business ==
- Expected commercial value, also known as estimated commercial value, the prospect-weighted value for a project with unclear conclusions

== See also ==
- Expected (disambiguation)
