= Expectation =

Expectation, or expectations, as well as expectancy or expectancies, may refer to:

== Science ==
- Expectancy effect (disambiguation)
  - Observer-expectancy effect
  - Subject-expectancy effect
- Expectancy theory, or expectancy theory of motivation
- Expectation (philosophy)
- Expected value, in mathematical probability theory
- Expectation value (quantum mechanics)
- Expectation–maximization algorithm, in statistics

== Music ==
- Expectation (album), a 2013 album by Girl's Day
- Expectation, a 2006 album by Matt Harding
- Expectation (EP), a 2023 extended play by D.O.
- Expectations (Keith Jarrett album), 1971
- Expectations (Dance Exponents album), 1985
- Expectations (Hayley Kiyoko album), 2018, or Expectations/Overture", a song from the album
- Expectations (Bebe Rexha album), 2018
- Expectations (Katie Pruitt album), 2020, or the title song
- "Expectation" (waltz), a 1980 waltz composed by Ilya Herold Lavrentievich Kittler
- "Expectation" (song), a 2010 song by Tame Impala
- "Expectations" (Lauren Jauregui song), 2018
- "Expectations" (Olivia Rodrigo song), 2026
- "Expectations", a song by Three Days Grace from Transit of Venus, 2012

== Television ==
- "Expectations" (Friday Night Lights), a 2010 episode
- "Expectations" (Juliet Bravo), a 1980 episode

== See also ==
- Expected value (disambiguation)
- Great Expectations, a novel by Charles Dickens
- Xpectation, 2003 studio album by Prince
