= Bulk dispatch lapse =

Bulk dispatch lapse (BDL) or bulk dispatch value lapse, depicts the depreciation of a distributed object to multiple consumers.

== Semantics ==
The BDL expects a decrease of a dispatched object's value for individuals, when delivered asynchronously. The initiation of the depreciation varies by context and may be subject of a variety of different depreciation functions.

"Lapse" describes the delay of the object being dispatched. It also depicts the depreciation of the value in the perception of an object consumer. The depreciation does not apply in the following cases: first, if the dispatch times to consumers are equal, i.e. delay cfirst = delay clast. On the other hand, if the delay of the object has neither a value depreciation nor a value appreciation. Another condition is the presence of multiple consumers. Multiple issuers of an object type is not a condition.

An extra factor is the processing of the object after receiving it. If the processing time is known in advance, the depreciation can be calculated on reception of the object. If not, the perception of the depreciation has to be suspended until the processing task is completed. Subsequently, if processing times among consumers are volatile and not deterministic, a consumer may discard to invoke the processing due to the risk of partial or full depreciation. Dealing with uncertainty and availability is a related topic. Morgan, Savage and others provided approaches of probability to cope with the risk of the processing task in vain.

Expected value of including uncertainty (EVIU) is a similar concept focusing on information and decision making. An EVIU can be incorporated into BDL or even represent the basis. The complementary contribution of BDL is defined by the multiplicity of the consumer of the object. The multiplicity results in a bulk dispatch.

== Consumers, objects and depreciation ==
Bulk dispatch lapse describes the bulk dispatching of objects. Consequently, it depicts how multiple recipients are supplied with an object by one or more issuers. In this context, recipients are termed "consumers", because they do not simply receive an object, they also need to consume and process it to estimate its value. For the term "BDL" an object is a placeholder for one variable of a function. This variable is capable of holding a non-nominal value perceived by a group of equal consumers. Again, the object is exposed to depreciation by consumers. In real world scenarios objects are typically raw and industry goods but can also be services or pure information.

== Types of depreciation ==
If conditions for a depreciation apply, various type of functions may determine the speed, interval and the direction.

=== Linear depreciation ===
A linear depreciation function accommodates the steady loss of the information value. This type of function might apply, for example, if a depreciation is coupled to a risk factor, which denotes the sheer chance that other consumers take note of the new dispatched object. The depreciation step equals the number of interested consumers. If the processing time of consumers are equal or similar, a linear depreciation is meaningful, too.

=== Threshold breaching function with knees ===
In other scenarios, a dispatched object immediately loses its full or partial value, if a certain number of consumers C_{a} have already received the object. In a function, the ordinate value takes on zero, if value x representing c_{n}, has received the value. It draws a dramatic knee on the function's graph. This scenario is prevalent. For example, on a social platform a supplier of sports gear promises the first 20 callers a free bicycle helmet. The lapse of this information is significant. Then, after the 20th reader has called, the information value drops down to zero. Dialling the phone number is considered the processing. Thus, the perception of the value of this information is postponed, after the processing of the information (object) is completed.

These knees in functions are defined by piecewise functions. Below is an exemplary piecewise linear function defining that as soon as x equals or is greater than x_{1}, the value of y is set to zero, respectively is not defined.

$$f(x)=\begin{cases}
mx+y_1-mx_1 & \text{if } 0 \leq x < x_1 \\
0 & \text{if } x \geq x_1
\end{cases}$$

=== Polynomial, regressive, degressive and progressive functions ===
Polynomial functions appear rarely. Because it entails that depreciation is being reduced, respectively appreciation of the object's value occurs. In other words, appreciation and depreciation occur once or multiple times as values in the x-axis (t) change. More likely is the presence of stagnation. That is, the function draws a (non-strictly) monotonous decreasing slope.

== Field of application ==
Bulk depreciation is often applied among competitive actors, who consume the same information units and/or resources. A prerequisite is that the consumers are capable of transforming the information in knowledge upon which they can react. In general and for non-polynomial depreciation functions, a faster reaction results in a beneficial outcome for the individual competitor.

- Economics: Customers of a company receiving a sales auction by conventional post (the later a customer empties their mailbox, the higher is the depreciation of the information).

The bulk dispatch lapse also occurs in a seemingly non-competitive environment. Where a communication system (information distribution system) has a broadcast/multicast nature. E.g. Publish and Subscribe Pattern.

- Robotics: A robot subscribes to a remote sensor topic, but there is a notable lapse/delay (e.g. by FIFO queue processing) and the robot's logic decides to process the information differently depending on the time lapse. ROS Message Age

== Term evolution ==
The term "BDL" arose from an academic deliverable of a student, Brayan Zimmerli, at the University of Zurich in 2013. The deliverable's core research question was to mitigate the unfairness of data delivery to multiple subscribers of a topic. In the context of enterprise application integration (EAI), unfairness related to the fact that technical difficulties of dispatching information inevitable leads to unfairness among the consumers of data. In other words, while consumer c_{first} has received an information, the value of the information to consumer c_{last} starts to decrease although c_{last} has not yet received the information. The field of research was limited to transactions of participants of financial exchanges.

== Discussion on negative depreciation ==
It is not ruled out that a depreciation may result negative. Thus, an appreciation may occur the later c_{last} consumes the object after c_{first}.

== See also ==
- Expected value of perfect information (EVPI)
- Expected value of sample information
