= Expected =

Expected may refer to:

- Expectation (epistemic)
- Expected value
- Expected shortfall
- Expected utility hypothesis
- Expected return
- Expected loss

== See also ==
- Unexpected (disambiguation)
- Expected value (disambiguation)
