= Harold W. Kuhn =

American game theorist (1925–2014)

- Born: July 29, 1925; Santa Monica, California
- Died: July 2, 2014 (aged 88); New York City, New York
- Education: Princeton University
- Known for: Hungarian method Karush–Kuhn–Tucker conditions Kuhn poker
- Awards: John von Neumann Theory Prize (1980)
- Scientific career
- Fields: Mathematics
- Institutions: Princeton University
- Thesis: Subgroup Theorems for Groups Presented by Generators and Relations (1950)
- Doctoral advisor: Ralph Fox
- Doctoral students: James G. MacKinnon; Guillermo Owen; Richard Stearns

Harold William Kuhn (July 29, 1925 – July 2, 2014) was an American mathematician who studied game theory. He won the 1980 John von Neumann Theory Prize jointly with David Gale and Albert W. Tucker. A former professor emeritus of mathematics at Princeton University, he is known for the Karush–Kuhn–Tucker conditions, for Kuhn's theorem, and for developing Kuhn poker. He described the Hungarian method for the assignment problem, but later a paper by Carl Gustav Jacobi was discovered that had described the Hungarian method a century before Kuhn, published posthumously in 1890 in Latin.

== Life ==
Kuhn was born in Santa Monica in 1925. He is known for his association with John Forbes Nash, as a fellow graduate student, a lifelong friend and colleague, and a key figure in getting Nash the attention of the Nobel Prize committee that led to Nash's 1994 Nobel Prize in Economics. Kuhn and Nash both had long associations and collaborations with Albert W. Tucker, who was Nash's dissertation advisor. Kuhn co-edited The Essential John Nash, and is credited as the mathematics consultant in the 2001 movie adaptation of Nash's life, A Beautiful Mind.

Harold Kuhn served as the third president of the Society for Industrial and Applied Mathematics (SIAM). He was elected to the 2002 class of Fellows of the Institute for Operations Research and the Management Sciences.

In 1949, he married Estelle Henkin, sister of logician Leon Henkin. His oldest son was oral historian Clifford Kuhn (1952–2015), an associate professor at Georgia State University noted for his scholarship on the American South. Another son, Nicholas Kuhn, is a professor of mathematics at the University of Virginia. His youngest son, Jonathan Kuhn, is Director of Art and Antiquities for the New York City Department of Parks & Recreation.

Kuhn died on July 2, 2014.

== Bibliography ==
- Kuhn, H. W. (1955). "The Hungarian method for the assignment problem". Naval Research Logistics Quarterly. 2 (1–2): 83–97. CiteSeerX 10.1.1.228.3906. doi:10.1002/nav.3800020109.
  - Republished; Kuhn, H. W. (2005). "The Hungarian method for the assignment problem". Naval Research Logistics. 52 (1): 7–21. CiteSeerX 10.1.1.228.5750. doi:10.1002/nav.20053. S2CID 247664096.
- Owen, Guillermo. (2004) "IFORS' Operational Research Hall of Fame Harold W. Kuhn" International Transactions in Operational Research 11 (6), 715–718. doi:10.1111/j.1475-3995.2004.00486.
- Kuhn, H.W. Classics in Game Theory. (Princeton University Press, 1997). ISBN 978-0-691-01192-9.
- Kuhn, H.W. Linear Inequalities and Related Systems (AM-38) (Princeton University Press, 1956). ISBN 978-0-691-07999-8.
- Kuhn, H.W. Contributions to the Theory of Games, I (AM-24). (Princeton University Press, 1950). ISBN 978-0-691-07934-9.
- Kuhn, H.W. Contributions to the Theory of Games, II (AM-28) (Princeton University Press, 1953). ISBN 978-0-691-07935-6.
- Kuhn, H.W. Lectures on the Theory of Games. (Princeton University Press, 2003). ISBN 978-0-691-02772-2.
- Kuhn, H.W. and Nasar, Sylvia, editors. The Essential John Nash. (Princeton University Press, 2001). ISBN 978-0-691-09527-1.
