= Perfect recall (game theory) =

Topic in game theory

In game theory, perfect recall is a property of players within extensive-form games, introduced by Harold W. Kuhn in 1953. it describes a player's ability to remember their past actions and the information they possessed at previous decision points. For example, in a simplified card game where a player makes multiple betting rounds, perfect recall means they remember their own previous bets and the cards they've seen. Essentially, it indicates that a player does not "forget" relevant information acquired during the game.

It is important to distinguish perfect recall from perfect information. While perfect information means all players know all previous actions of all players, perfect recall means a player remembers their own past actions and knowledge.

== Significance ==
Perfect recall is crucial for the consistency of rational decision-making in sequential games. If a player forgets past information, their current decisions may contradict their earlier intentions. The concept plays a key role in the relationship between mixed and behavioral strategies. In games where players have perfect recall, these two types of strategies are essentially equivalent, meaning that any outcome that can be achieved with a mixed strategy can also be achieved with a behavioral strategy, and vice versa. This equivalence, notably formalized in Kuhn's theorem, simplifies the analysis of such games. It is a core component of how game theorists analyze extensive-form games.

The formal definition of perfect recall involves the concept of information sets in extensive-form games. It ensures that if a player reaches a certain information set, the player's past actions and information are consistent with all the nodes within that information set. Games with players possessing perfect recall are often easier to analyze than those where players do not. Conversely, a lack of perfect recall by a player can lead to situations where that player is unable to execute planned strategies, affecting game outcomes.

== See also ==
- Kuhn's theorem
