= Kuhn poker =

Poker game developed by Harold Kuhn

Kuhn poker is a simplified form of poker developed by Harold W. Kuhn as a simple model zero-sum two-player imperfect-information game, amenable to a complete game-theoretic analysis. In Kuhn poker, the deck includes only three playing cards, for example, a King, Queen, and Jack. Both players are dealt a card, and they may choose to bet or check. If both players bet or both players check, the player with the higher card wins. Otherwise, the betting player wins.

== Game description ==
In conventional poker terms, a game of Kuhn poker proceeds as follows:

- Each player antes 1.
- Each player is dealt one of the three cards, and the third is put aside unseen.
- Player one can check or bet 1.
  - If player one checks then player two can check or bet 1.
    - If player two checks there is a showdown for the pot of 2 (i.e. the higher card wins 1 from the other player).
    - If player two bets then player one can fold or call.
      - If player one folds then player two takes the pot of 3 (i.e. winning 1 from player 1).
      - If player one calls there is a showdown for the pot of 4 (i.e. the higher card wins 2 from the other player).
  - If player one bets then player two can fold or call.
    - If player two folds then player one takes the pot of 3 (i.e. winning 1 from player 2).
    - If player two calls there is a showdown for the pot of 4 (i.e. the higher card wins 2 from the other player).

== Optimal strategy ==
The game has a mixed-strategy Nash equilibrium; when both players play equilibrium strategies, the first player should expect to lose at a rate of −1/18 per hand (as the game is zero-sum, the second player should expect to win at a rate of +1/18). There is no pure-strategy equilibrium.

Kuhn demonstrated there are infinitely many equilibrium strategies for the first player, forming a continuum governed by a single parameter. In one possible formulation, player one freely chooses the probability $\alpha \isin [0, 1/3]$ with which they will bet when having a Jack (otherwise they check; if the other player bets, they should always fold). When having a King, they should bet with the probability of $3\alpha$ (otherwise they check; if the other player bets, they should always call). They should always check when having a Queen, and if the other player bets after this check, they should call with the probability of $\alpha + 1/3$.

The second player has a single equilibrium strategy: Always betting or calling when having a King; when having a Queen, checking if possible, otherwise calling with the probability of 1/3; when having a Jack, never calling and betting with the probability of 1/3.

Complete tree of Kuhn poker including probabilities for mixed-strategy Nash equilibrium. Dotted lines mark subtrees for dominated strategies.

== Generalized versions ==
In addition to the basic version invented by Kuhn, other versions appeared adding a bigger deck, more players, betting rounds, etc., increasing the complexity of the game.

=== 3-player Kuhn Poker ===
A variant for three players was introduced in 2010 by Nick Abou Risk and Duane Szafron. In this version, the deck includes four cards (adding a ten card), from which three are dealt to the players; otherwise, the basic structure is the same: while there is no outstanding bet, a player can check or bet, with an outstanding bet, a player can call or fold. If all players checked or at least one player called, the game proceeds to showdown, otherwise, the betting player wins.

A family of Nash equilibria for 3-player Kuhn poker is known analytically, which makes it the largest game with more than two players with analytic solution. The family is parameterized using 4–6 parameters (depending on the chosen equilibrium). In all equilibria, player 1 has a fixed strategy, and they always check as the first action; player 2's utility is constant, equal to –1/48 per hand. The discovered equilibrium profiles show an interesting feature: by adjusting a strategy parameter $\beta$ (between 0 and 1), player 2 can freely shift utility between the other two players while still remaining in equilibrium; player 1's utility is equal to $-\frac{1+2\beta}{48}$ (which is always worse than player 2's utility), player 3's utility is $\frac{1+\beta}{24}$.

It is not known if this equilibrium family covers all Nash equilibria for the game.
