= Anticipation =

Emotion involving pleasure or anxiety in considering or awaiting an expected event

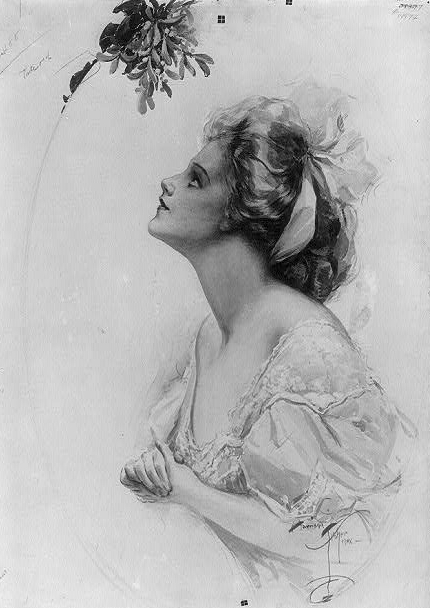
Anticipation (1909) by Harrison Fisher

Anticipation is an emotion involving pleasure or anxiety in considering or awaiting an expected event. Anticipatory emotions include fear, anxiety, excitement, hope, and trust. When the anticipated event fails to occur, it results in disappointment (for a positive event) or relief (for a negative one).

== As a defence mechanism ==
Robin Skynner considered anticipation as one of "the mature ways of dealing with real stress.... You reduce the stress of some difficult challenge by anticipating what it will be like and preparing for how you are going to deal with it". There is evidence that "the use of mature defenses (sublimation, anticipation) tended to increase with age", yet anticipation of negative events itself tends to decrease with age.

== Desire ==
Anticipation has been described as "the central ingredient in sexual desire." As "sex has a major cognitive component — the most important element for desire is positive anticipation". One name for pleasurable anticipation is excitement.

More broadly, anticipation is a central motivating force in everyday life — "the normal process of imaginative anticipation of, or speculation about, the future". To enjoy one's life, "one needs a belief in Time as a promising medium to do things in; one needs to be able to suffer the pains and pleasures of anticipation and deferral".

== In music ==
There are several theories explaining anticipation in music. Two prominent theories are the neurological theories of Chase that attribute expectation building and anticipation both to inherent neurological pitch evolution (Darwinian selection as pitch/rhythm/harmony communication response expectation) and the related skillful use of chord sequences (holding V7 until expectations are met with E, A, B7, or the well-known Am/D7/G tease-satisfy sequence, with variations in the wheel of fifths).

A second well-accepted theory is Huron's "ITPRA" 5 module theory of expectation, where previous imaginative tension hits the event onset/horizon, with prediction and reaction oscillating (alternating) in the response system, and resulting in appraisal feedback.

From a global perspective, even given thousands of varying scale types worldwide, there is a universal human sense of satisfaction in the return to that scale's tonic (for example, C, in the major scale, key, and tonic of C major).

In the context of the broader topic of Music and emotion, Juslin & Västfjäll's BRECVEM model includes, as its seventh element, Musical expectation.

Technically, anticipation also refers specifically to a type of nonchord tone.

Note: This section refers to the process of generating the thought or feeling of anticipation in music. For titles of songs with the word "anticipation", see Anticipation (disambiguation).

== In phenomenology ==
For phenomenological philosopher Edmund Husserl, anticipation is an essential feature of human action. "In every action we know the goal in advance in the form of an anticipation that is 'empty', in the sense of vague...and [we] seek by our action to bring it step by step to concrete realization".

== See also ==
- Prediction
- Expectation (epistemic)
- Hope
- Optimism
- Faith
- Confidence
- Delayed gratification
