= Kuhn's theorem =

Theorem in game theory

In game theory, Kuhn's theorem is a foundational result in the analysis of extensive-form games, first formalized by American mathematician Harold W. Kuhn in 1953. The theorem establishes a formal equivalence between two types of strategies in extensive-form games with perfect recall: mixed strategies and behavior strategies.

A mixed strategy assigns probabilities to complete plans of action (also called pure strategies), while a behavior strategy assigns probabilities to individual actions at each decision point. Kuhn's theorem shows that in any finite extensive-form game where players have perfect recall (the ability to remember all of their previous moves and information), every mixed strategy has an equivalent behavior strategy that yields the same outcome probabilities, and vice versa. This result ensures that behavior strategies—often simpler and more intuitive in sequential settings—can be used without loss of generality.

The theorem plays a central role in simplifying the analysis of sequential games and underlies many results in both theoretical and applied game theory. It is valid both for finite games, as well as infinite games (i.e., games with continuous choices, or iterated infinitely).
