= Structural Health Monitoring =

- Discipline: Structural health monitoring
- Language: English
- Edited by: Fu-Kuo Chang

Publication details
- History: 2002-present
- Publisher: SAGE Publications
- Frequency: Bimonthly
- Impact factor: 4.939 (2019)

Standard abbreviations
- ISO 4: Struct. Health Monit.

Indexing
- ISSN: 1475-9217 (print); 1741-3168 (web)
- OCLC no.: 50719825

Links
- Journal homepage; Online access; Online archive

Structural Health Monitoring is a peer-reviewed scientific journal that covers the field of engineering, especially concerning Structural health monitoring. Its editor-in-chief is Fu-Kuo Chang (simplified Chinese: 张富国; traditional Chinese: 張富國; pinyin: Zhāng Fùguó) of Stanford University. The journal was established in 2002 and is published by SAGE Publications.

== Abstracting and indexing ==
The journal is abstracted and indexed in the Science Citation Index Expanded. According to the Journal Citation Reports, its 2013 impact factor is 3.206.
