= Guillermo Owen =

Colombian mathematician (born 1938)

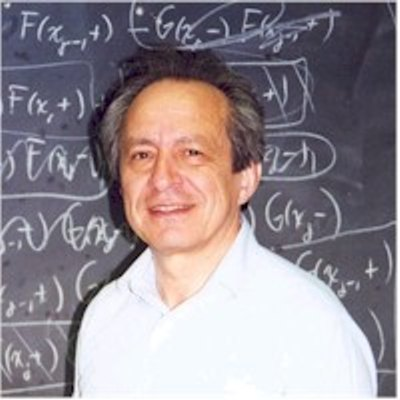
- Born: May 4, 1938 (age 88); Bogotá, Colombia
- Education: Fordham University; Princeton University
- Scientific career
- Fields: Mathematics
- Workplaces: Fordham University; Rice University; Los Andes University; Naval Postgraduate School
- Doctoral advisor: Harold Kuhn

Guillermo Owen (born 1938) is a Colombian mathematician, and professor emeritus of applied mathematics at the Naval Postgraduate School in Monterey, California, known for his work in game theory. He is also the son of the Mexican poet and diplomat Gilberto Owen.

== Biography ==
Guillermo Owen was born May 4, 1938, in Bogotá, Colombia, and obtained a B.S. degree from Fordham University in 1958, and a Ph.D. degree from Princeton University under the guidance of Dr. Harold Kuhn in 1962.

Owen has taught at Fordham University (1961–1969), Rice University (1969–1977) and Los Andes University in Colombia (1978–1982, 2008), apart from having given lectures in many universities in Europe and Latin America. He is currently holding the position of Distinguished Professor of applied mathematics at the Naval Postgraduate School in Monterey, California.

Owen is member of the Colombian Academy of Sciences, The Royal Academy of Arts and Sciences of Barcelona, and the Third World Academy of Sciences. He is associate editor of International Journal of Game Theory, and fellow of the International Game Theory Society.

== Honors and awards ==
The Escuela Naval Almirante Padilla of Cartagena gave him an honorary degree of Naval Science Professional in June 2004.

Owen was named Honorary President of the XIV Latin Ibero American Congress on Operations Research - CLAIO 2008. Cartagena, Colombia, September 2008.

The university of Lower Normandy, in Caen, France, gave him an honorary doctorate in October 2017.

== Publications ==
Owen has authored, translated and/or edited thirteen books, and approximately one hundred and forty papers published in journals such as Management Science, Operations Research, International Journal of Game Theory, American Political Science Review, and Mathematical Programming, among others. Owen's books include:

- 1968. Game theory. Academic Press
- 1970. Finite mathematics and calculus; mathematics for the social and management sciences. With M. Evans Munroe.
- 1983. Information pooling and group decision making : proceedings of the Second University of California, Irvine, Conference on Political Economy. Edited with Bernard Grofman.
- 1999. Discrete mathematics and game theory.
- 2001. Power indices and coalition formation. Edited with Manfred J. Holler.
