= Climate information services =

Dissemination of climate data

Climate information services (CIS) entail the dissemination of climate data in a way that aids people and organizations in making decisions. CIS helps its users foresee and control the hazards associated with a changing and unpredictable climate. It encompasses a knowledge loop that includes targeted user communities' access to, interpretation of, communication of, and use of pertinent, accurate, and trustworthy climate information, as well as their feedback on that use. Climate information services involve the timely production, translation and delivery of useful climate data, information and knowledge.

Climate services are systems to deliver the best available climate information to end-users in the most usable and accessible formats. They aim to support climate change adaptation, mitigation and risk management decisions. There is a vast range of practices and products for interpreting, analyzing, and communicating climate data. They often combine different sources and different types of knowledge. They aim to fulfil a well-specified need. These climate services mark a shift from supply-driven information products that result from scientific research. Instead they are demand-driven and take greater account of users’ needs and decision-making. To do so they require different types of user–producer engagement, depending on what the service aims to deliver. This type of collaboration is called co-design.

Climate services vary in their structure and objectives. They are set up to help users cope with current climate variability and limit the damage caused by climate-related disasters. They can also serve as an important measure to reduce risks in a particular sector. One example is Copernicus Climate Change Service (C3S), which provides free and open access to climate data, tools and information used for a variety of purposes. Another example is Participatory Integrated Climate Services for Agriculture (PICSA). This is a participatory approach which combines historical climate data and forecasts with farmers’ local contextual knowledge.

== Definition ==
Climate information (CI) refers to the gathering and analysis of actual weather and climate observations as well as simulations of the climate for the past, the present and the future. Climate information services entail the dissemination of climate data in a way that aids people and organizations in making decisions. CIS helps its users foresee and control the hazards associated with a shifting and unpredictable environment.

== Types of climate information ==
There are three main types of climate information commonly provided through CS. These are forecasts, agrometeorological services, and early warnings.

Forecasts use in farming operations: Several CS projects in the African agriculture sector have applied forecasts of varying timescale in providing risk warning and risk response advisory services to farmers. The five timescale forecasts most widely used in the production of climate risk warnings and risk response advisory services are: (1) Weather forecasts (daily to weekly), (2) Seasonal forecasts (on a timescale of 1–6 months), (3) Short-term forecasts (1–5 years), (4) Intra-decadal/Medium-term forecasts (5–10 years), and (5) Decadal forecasts. The most commonly used among these forecasts are short-term, seasonal, and weather forecasts. Intra-decadal and decadal forecasts are sparingly used in agricultural risk management, even though they may be more useful for making a strategic decision and anticipatory adaptation plans.

Agrometeorological services: Agrometeorological services are the second most common type of climate information provided by the CS. Included in this category is information provided to manage the impact of both climate change and climate variability. This includes advisory information on the scheduling of planting operations, weeding, fertilizer applications, etc. CS is also, in some cases, used to provide information on climate-smart agriculture practices (CSA). The type of CSA information communicated includes conservation farming practices like ridging, minimum tillage, soil conservation practices, etc. The use of CS to communicate agrometeorological services and CSA to farmers is acknowledged as a valuable innovation to assist decision-making and develop farmers’ specific adaptive capacities.

Early warning interventions: The third type of climate information provided through CS are early warnings. Early warning intervention provisioning is commonly used for drought, flood, and wildfire risk warnings. Early warnings are rarely solely disseminated to users; rather, they are provided in combination with agrometeorological services. The early and timely delivery of early warnings is increasingly being facilitated through the integration of ICT CS dissemination strategy.

== International initiatives ==
In 2009, the Global Framework for Climate Services (GFCS) of the World Meteorological Organization was established, with the goal to enable better management of the risks of climate risks through the integration of climate information and prediction into planning, policy and practice. To achieve its mission, the GFCS works across five priority areas:

- Agriculture and Food Security (working with partners in the UN 'system' such as the Food and Agriculture Organization and the World Food Programme)
- Disaster Risk Reduction (working with the UN Office for Disaster Risk Reduction to include climate information and prediction into managing disaster risk)
- Energy (developing tailored weather–water–climate services working with the energy industry)
- Health (working with the World Health Organisation and other organisations to develop reliable health and climate-related tools and services for various time scales)
- Water (working with UN-Water and the Global Water Partnership to focus on the climate services required to support Integrated Water Resources Management)

== Examples by region ==
=== Africa ===
CIS has become a popular initiative in national and regional initiatives aimed at enhancing stakeholders’ access to tailored and contextual climate information for adapting farming practices to climate and socioeconomic risks in Africa. The primary economic sectors in Africa are extremely susceptible to the effects of climate change and fluctuation. Using agriculture as an example, the sector employs up to 80% of the population and provides about 30% of the GDP. Since more than 90% of our agriculture is rainfed, climate observation systems suggest that rainfall in Africa is becoming more unpredictable. This sector looks to be one of the most hit by climate variability and change.

Farmers who have access to high-quality data customized to their needs can plan what and when to plant; policymakers who have access to precise data and analysis can make well-informed judgments. Governments are also considerably more likely to incorporate climate policies by using demand-led, evidence-based data. However, due to the global disparity in the supply of climate information services, farmers in Africa are vulnerable to climate and extreme weather risk.

With robust climate information, Africa can safeguard the economic gains and advances in social development seen across the continent over the last decade.

There are data gaps at various levels because the majority of the acquired data were written down on paper rather than being electronically catalogued. Not withstanding the hurdles facing the private sector, a few private sectors have been successful in offering climate information services throughout Africa.

There is a developing market for climate information services for the business sector. Additionally, there is a growing understanding that through public-private partnerships, private service providers might make investments in necessary machinery and provide accurate climatic information. Climate services are provided by the private sector at many different stages of the value chain. Its services include everything from delivering customized, value-added products and services to end users to assisting with weather monitoring. Seasonal forecasts, during the beginning of the rainy season (and the planting season for farmers), and other services are typically offered by the private sector. Additionally, they offer information on extreme weather conditions to disaster relief organizations and vulnerable communities. Viamo offers a variety of services, including the provision of information in any phone owner's preferred language, including weather and climatic data, for a fee. Farmers and members of the informal sector can access essential information and services thanks to Esoko's Digital Farmer Services.

Several initiatives for scaling up the implementation of CIS in the African agriculture sector have been adopted. Some of these initiatives include: the African Center of Meteorological Applications for Development (in 1995), the Climate Services Partnership (in 2011), the Global Framework of Climate Services (in 2012), and the Climate Services for Resilient Development Partnership (in 2017). These initiatives have been used in several approaches to facilitate the production and dissemination of climate information to stakeholders in the agricultural sector. The Global Framework of Climate Services, for example, implemented several projects in many African countries that aimed to facilitate timely delivery of contextual climate information to stakeholders through a collaborative participatory process. Similarly, the African Centre of Meteorological Application for Development initiative implemented several projects aimed at producing forecasts of an appropriate timeline that are most suitable to decision-making in the agricultural sector

=== Europe ===
In 2015, the European Commission launched the Climate Services Roadmap. Research and innovation has been supported through the European Research Area for Climate Services (ERA4CS) Programme. The new EU Adaptation Strategy from 2021 also highlighted the key role for climate services in supporting climate change adaptation.

The climate services sector in Europe is quite well established. One example in Europe is Copernicus Climate Change Service (C3S), which provides free and open access to climate data, tools and information used for a variety of purposes. Another example is Participatory Integrated Climate Services for Agriculture (PICSA). This is a participatory approach which combines historical climate data and forecasts with farmers’ local contextual knowledge.

== Economics of climate and weather-related investments ==
An economic approach assesses the value of information by its effects on decisions. Information has value only if it leads users to act differently, and its net value is the gain from those better decisions minus the cost of providing it. An early application to climate-related matters in developing countries was by Raaj Sah in 1979. He argued that these countries are more dependent on climate than industrialized ones, because most lie in the tropics, where rainfall is more variable, and their economies rely heavily on agriculture. He compared the costs and benefits of climatology, weather forecasting, weather modification and research on long-term climate trends. He observed that applied climatology has the best benefit-cost ratio, followed by forecasting aimed at practical needs such as agriculture.

In 1987, Sah added that tropical countries should pursue simple forecasts tied to specific choices, such as whether a dry spell will follow the first monsoon rains, rather than highly detailed predictions. He also argued that this information and these forecasts would be of little use unless they reached end users.

Later reviewers have found that the economic literature on weather and climate information is concentrated in high-income countries, and they call for more studies in low- and middle-income countries.

== See also ==
- Climate change adaptation
