= Unexpected =

Unexpected may refer to:

== Film and television ==
- Unexpected (2005 film), an Italian documentary directed by Domenico Distilo
- Unexpected (2015 film), an American film directed by Kris Swanberg
- The Unexpected (TV series), a 1950s TV anthology series
- "Unexpected" (Heroes), a television episode
- "Unexpected" (Star Trek: Enterprise), a television episode

== Literature ==
- The Unexpected (1968 comic book), a 1968–1982 DC Comics horror-fantasy series, a continuation of Tales of the Unexpected
- The Unexpected (2018 comic book), a 2018–2019 DC Comics superhero series
- The Unexpected (novel), a 2000 Animorphs novel by K.A. Applegate
- "The Unexpected", a short story by Kate Chopin

== Music ==
- Unexpected (Angie Stone album) or the title song, 2008
- Unexpected (Levina album), 2017
- Unexpected (Lumidee album), 2007
- Unexpected (Michelle Williams album) or the title song, 2008
- Unexpected (Sandy Mölling album) or the title song (see below), 2004
- Unexpected, an album by Jason Crabb, 2018
- Unexpected, an album by Marla Glen, 2020
- The Unexpected (album), by Beautiful Sin, 2006
- "Unexpected" (song), by Sandy, 2004

== See also ==
- Anticipation (disambiguation)
- Unintended consequences, also unanticipated or unforeseen consequences, unexpected benefits and unexpected drawbacks
