= Value of structural health information =

The value of structural health information is the expected utility gain of a built environment system by information provided by structural health monitoring (SHM). The quantification of the value of structural health information is based on decision analysis adapted to built environment engineering. The value of structural health information can be significant for the risk and integrity management of built environment systems.

== Background ==
The value of structural health information takes basis in the framework of the decision analysis and the value of information analysis as introduced by Raiffa and Schlaifer and adapted to civil engineering by Benjamin and Cornell. Decision theory itself is based upon the expected utility hypothesis by von Neumann and Morgenstern. The concepts for the value of structural health information in built environment engineering were first formulated by Pozzi and Der Kiureghian and Faber and Thöns.

== Formulation ==
The value of structural health information is quantified with a normative decision analysis. The value of structural health monitoring $V$ is calculated as the difference between the optimized expected utilities of performing and not performing structural health monitoring (SHM), $U_1$ and $U_0$, respectively:

$V=U_1-U_0$

The expected utilities are calculated with a decision scenario involving (1) interrelated built environment system state, utility and consequence models, (2) structural health information type, precision and cost models and (2) structural health action type and implementation models. The value of structural health information quantification facilitates an optimization of structural health information system parameters and information dependent actions.

== Application ==
The value of structural health information provides a quantitative decision basis for (1) implementing SHM or not, (2) the identification of the optimal SHM strategy and (3) for planning optimal structural health actions, such as e.g., repair and replacement. The value of structural health information presupposes relevance of SHM information for the built environment system performance. A significant value of structural health information has been found for the risk and integrity management of engineering structures.
