= Expectation (waltz) =

"Expectation" (Russian: ожидание) is a Russian song composed by musician Herold Lavrentievich Kittler (Герольд Лаврентьевич Китлер).

The origin of this piece is nebulous, as many Klezmer orchestras know this song as a Yiddish piece (Ersther valts—Mayn ershte groyse freyd) and plenty of Russians claim this is a Soviet Army song. An even less well known song that goes by the name Awaiting uses the same melody with Russian lyrics. The original version of the song was written in F Minor and B♭ minor while the Klezmer version for the accordion and clarinet is in D Minor or E Minor. Expectation is mostly made of minor notes along with relative minor thirds and sub-4th octaves, adding to its solemnity.

This piece has been featured in many places, such as the Russian film "Optimistic Tragedy" and a famous Klezmer player Dave Tarras' album Freilach in Hi-Fi. Most of these appearances do not list the true song's name.
