= Influence diagram =

Visual representation of a decision-making problem

An influence diagram (ID) (also called a relevance diagram, decision diagram or a decision network) is a compact graphical and mathematical representation of a decision situation. It is a generalization of a Bayesian network, in which not only probabilistic inference problems but also decision making problems (following the maximum expected utility criterion) can be modeled and solved.

ID was first developed in the mid-1970s by decision analysts with an intuitive semantic that is easy to understand. It is now adopted widely and becoming an alternative to the decision tree which typically suffers from exponential growth in number of branches with each variable modeled. ID is directly applicable in team decision analysis, since it allows incomplete sharing of information among team members to be modeled and solved explicitly. Extensions of ID also find their use in game theory as an alternative representation of the game tree.

== Semantics ==
An ID is a directed acyclic graph with three types (plus one subtype) of node and three types of arc (or arrow) between nodes.

Nodes:

- Decision node (corresponding to each decision to be made) is drawn as a rectangle.
- Uncertainty node (corresponding to each uncertainty to be modeled) is drawn as an oval.

- Deterministic node (corresponding to special kind of uncertainty that its outcome is deterministically known whenever the outcome of some other uncertainties are also known) is drawn as a double oval.

- Value node (corresponding to each component of additively separable Von Neumann-Morgenstern utility function) is drawn as an octagon (or diamond).

Arcs:

- Functional arcs (ending in value node) indicate that one of the components of additively separable utility function is a function of all the nodes at their tails.
- Conditional arcs (ending in uncertainty node) indicate that the uncertainty at their heads is probabilistically conditioned on all the nodes at their tails.

- Conditional arcs (ending in deterministic node) indicate that the uncertainty at their heads is deterministically conditioned on all the nodes at their tails.

- Informational arcs (ending in decision node) indicate that the decision at their heads is made with the outcome of all the nodes at their tails known beforehand.

Given a properly structured ID:

- Decision nodes and incoming information arcs collectively state the alternatives (what can be done when the outcome of certain decisions and/or uncertainties are known beforehand)
- Uncertainty/deterministic nodes and incoming conditional arcs collectively model the information (what are known and their probabilistic/deterministic relationships)
- Value nodes and incoming functional arcs collectively quantify the preference (how things are preferred over one another).

Alternative, information, and preference are termed decision basis in decision analysis, they represent three required components of any valid decision situation.

Formally, the semantic of influence diagram is based on sequential construction of nodes and arcs, which implies a specification of all conditional independencies in the diagram. The specification is defined by the $d$-separation criterion of Bayesian network. According to this semantic, every node is probabilistically independent on its non-successor nodes given the outcome of its immediate predecessor nodes. Likewise, a missing arc between non-value node $X$ and non-value node $Y$ implies that there exists a set of non-value nodes $Z$, e.g., the parents of $Y$, that renders $Y$ independent of $X$ given the outcome of the nodes in $Z$.

== Example ==
Simple influence diagram for making decision about vacation activity

Consider the simple influence diagram representing a situation where a decision-maker is planning their vacation.

- There is 1 decision node (Vacation Activity), 2 uncertainty nodes (Weather Condition, Weather Forecast), and 1 value node (Satisfaction).
- There are 2 functional arcs (ending in Satisfaction), 1 conditional arc (ending in Weather Forecast), and 1 informational arc (ending in Vacation Activity).

- Functional arcs ending in Satisfaction indicate that Satisfaction is a utility function of Weather Condition and Vacation Activity. In other words, their satisfaction can be quantified if they know what the weather is like and what their choice of activity is. (Note that they do not value Weather Forecast directly)
- Conditional arc ending in Weather Forecast indicates their belief that Weather Forecast and Weather Condition can be dependent.
- Informational arc ending in Vacation Activity indicates that they will only know Weather Forecast, not Weather Condition, when making their choice. In other words, actual weather will be known after they make their choice, and only forecast is what they can count on at this stage.

- It also follows semantically, for example, that Vacation Activity is independent on (irrelevant to) Weather Condition given Weather Forecast is known.

== Applicability to value of information ==
The above example highlights the power of the influence diagram in representing an extremely important concept in decision analysis known as the value of information. Consider the following three scenarios;

- Scenario 1: The decision-maker could make their Vacation Activity decision while knowing what Weather Condition will be like. This corresponds to adding extra informational arc from Weather Condition to Vacation Activity in the above influence diagram.
- Scenario 2: The original influence diagram as shown above.
- Scenario 3: The decision-maker makes their decision without even knowing the Weather Forecast. This corresponds to removing informational arc from Weather Forecast to Vacation Activity in the above influence diagram.

Scenario 1 is the best possible scenario for this decision situation since there is no longer any uncertainty on what they care about (Weather Condition) when making their decision. Scenario 3, however, is the worst possible scenario for this decision situation since they need to make their decision without any hint (Weather Forecast) on what they care about (Weather Condition) will turn out to be.

The decision-maker is usually better off (definitely no worse off, on average) to move from scenario 3 to scenario 2 through the acquisition of new information. The most they should be willing to pay for such move is called the value of information on Weather Forecast, which is essentially the value of imperfect information on Weather Condition.

The applicability of this simple ID and the value of information concept is tremendous, especially in medical decision making when most decisions have to be made with imperfect information about their patients, diseases, etc.

== Related concepts ==
Influence diagrams are hierarchical and can be defined either in terms of their structure or in greater detail in terms of the functional and numerical relation between diagram elements. An ID that is consistently defined at all levels—structure, function, and number—is a well-defined mathematical representation and is referred to as a well-formed influence diagram (WFID). WFIDs can be evaluated using reversal and removal operations to yield answers to a large class of probabilistic, inferential, and decision questions. More recent techniques have been developed by artificial intelligence researchers concerning Bayesian network inference (belief propagation).

An influence diagram having only uncertainty nodes (i.e., a Bayesian network) is also called a relevance diagram. An arc connecting node A to B implies not only that "A is relevant to B", but also that "B is relevant to A" (i.e., relevance is a symmetric relationship).

== See also ==
- Bayesian network
- Binary decision diagram
- Decision making software
- Decision tree
- Fishbone diagram
- Flowchart
- Morphological analysis

== Bibliography ==
- Detwarasiti, A.; Shachter, R.D. (December 2005). "Influence diagrams for team decision analysis" (PDF). Decision Analysis. 2 (4): 207–228. doi:10.1287/deca.1050.0047.
- Holtzman, Samuel (1988). Intelligent decision systems. Addison-Wesley. ISBN 978-0-201-11602-1.
- Howard, R.A. and J.E. Matheson, "Influence diagrams" (1981), in Readings on the Principles and Applications of Decision Analysis, eds. R.A. Howard and J.E. Matheson, Vol. II (1984), Menlo Park CA: Strategic Decisions Group.
- Koller, D.; Milch, B. (October 2003). "Multi-agent influence diagrams for representing and solving games" (PDF). Games and Economic Behavior. 45: 181–221. doi:10.1016/S0899-8256(02)00544-4.
- Pearl, Judea (1988). Probabilistic Reasoning in Intelligent Systems: Networks of Plausible Inference. Representation and Reasoning Series. San Mateo CA: Morgan Kaufmann. ISBN 0-934613-73-7.
- Shachter, R.D. (November–December 1986). "Evaluating influence diagrams" (PDF). Operations Research. 34 (6): 871–882. doi:10.1287/opre.34.6.871.
- Shachter, R.D. (July–August 1988). "Probabilistic inference and influence diagrams" (PDF). Operations Research. 36 (4): 589–604. doi:10.1287/opre.36.4.589. hdl:10338.dmlcz/135724.
- Virine, Lev; Trumper, Michael (2008). Project Decisions: The Art and Science. Vienna VA: Management Concepts. ISBN 978-1-56726-217-9.
- Pearl, J. (1985). Bayesian Networks: A Model of Self-Activated Memory for Evidential Reasoning (UCLA Technical Report CSD-850017). Proceedings of the Seventh Annual Conference of the Cognitive Science Society 15–17 April 1985. University of California, Irvine, CA. pp. 329–334.
