= Anticipation (disambiguation) =

Anticipation is an emotion involving pleasure in considering some expected or longed-for good event, or irritation at having to wait.

Anticipation may also refer to:

== In media and entertainment ==
- Anticipation (video game), a 1988 game for the Nintendo Entertainment System
- Anticipation (advertisement), a 1994–1995 advertising campaign for Guinness
- The 67th World Science Fiction Convention, also known as Anticipation, a 2009 science fiction convention held in Montreal
- Anticipation, a psychic ability that Odd Della Robbia possessed in the first season of Code Lyoko; an ability he also called "future flash"

== In music ==
- Anticipation (Carly Simon album), 1971
  - "Anticipation" (song), the title track of this album
- Anticipation (Lewis Black album), 2008
- Anticipation (Josh Nelson album), 2004
- Anticipation (mixtape), a 2009 mixtape by Trey Songz
- Anticipation, a type of nonchord tone
- "Anticipation", a song by Blonde Redhead from their 2004 album Misery Is a Butterfly
- "Anticipation", a track from the soundtrack of the 2015 video game Undertale by Toby Fox

== In other uses ==
- Anticipation (animation), a principle in animation that a movement needs a preparatory movement as an anticipation for the actual movement
- Anticipation (artificial intelligence), the concept of an agent making decisions
- Anticipation (genetics), where the severity of a genetic disorder increases with each generation
- Under patent law, when one prior art reference or event discloses all the features of a claim, so that it lacks novelty

== See also ==
- "Anticipating", a 2002 song by Britney Spears
