= Naval Research Logistics =

- Discipline: Operations research, applied statistics, quantitative modeling
- Language: English
- Edited by: Ming Hu

Publication details
- Former name(s): Naval Research Logistics Quarterly
- History: 1954-present
- Publisher: John Wiley & Sons (United States)
- Impact factor: 2.3

Standard abbreviations
- ISO 4: Nav. Res. Logist.
- MathSciNet: Naval Res. Logist.

Indexing
- ISSN: 1520-6750

Links
- Journal homepage

Naval Research Logistics is a peer-reviewed scientific journal that publishes papers in the field of logistics, especially those in the areas of operations research, applied statistics, and quantitative modeling. It was established in 1954 and is published by John Wiley & Sons. Its current editor is Ming Hu.
